The Reconstruction era was a period in American history following the American Civil War (1861–1865) and lasting until approximately the Compromise of 1877. During Reconstruction, attempts were made to rebuild the country after the bloody Civil War, bring the former Confederate states back into the United States, and to counteract the political, social, and economic legacies of slavery.

During the era, Congress abolished slavery, ended the remnants of Confederate secession in the South, and passed the 13th, 14th, and 15th Amendments to the Constitution (the Reconstruction Amendments) ostensibly guaranteeing the newly freed slaves (freedmen) the same civil rights as those of whites.  Following a year of violent attacks against Blacks in the South, in 1866 Congress  federalized the protection of civil rights, and placed formerly secessionist states under the control of the U.S. military, requiring ex-Confederate states to adopt guarantees for the civil rights of freedmen before they could be readmitted to the Union. In nearly all ex-Confederate states, Republican coalitions  set out to transform Southern society. The Freedmen's Bureau and the U.S. Army both aimed to implement a post-slavery free labor economy, protect the legal rights of freedmen, negotiate labor contracts, and helped establish networks of schools and churches. Thousands of Northerners ("Carpetbaggers") came to the South  to serve in the social and economic programs of Reconstruction. White Southerners who supported Reconstruction policies and efforts were known as "Scalawags".

Fighting against suffrage and full rights for freedmen, and in favor of giving the returning Southern states relatively free rein over former slaves, were the white "Redeemers"; Southern Bourbon Democrats;  Vice President Andrew Johnson, a Southerner who assumed the presidency after the assassination of President Abraham Lincoln; and especially the Ku Klux Klan, which intimidated, terrorized, and murdered freedmen and Republicans, including Arkansas Congressman James M. Hinds, throughout the former Confederacy.   

Republican President Ulysses S. Grant (1869–1877) succeeded Johnson and supported congressional Reconstruction and the protection of African Americans in the South, but eventually support for Reconstruction declined in the North with "Liberal Republicans" joining Democrats in calling for a withdrawal of the Army from the South. In 1877, as part of a congressional compromise to elect a Republican as president after a disputed election, federal troops were withdrawn from the three Southern states where they remained.

Among the many "shortcomings and failures" of Reconstruction were the failure to protect freed blacks from Ku Klux Klan violence prior to 1871, starvation, disease and death, brutal treatment of Union soldiers, and the offering of reparations to former slaveowners but not to former slaves. However, Reconstruction did succeed in restoring the federal Union, limiting reprisals against the South directly after the war, establishing the constitutional rights to national birthright citizenship, due process, equal protection of the laws, and male suffrage regardless of race, and a framework for eventual legal equality for black people.

Dating the Reconstruction era
In different states, Reconstruction began and ended at different times. Generally, scholars periodize federal Reconstruction as starting in the 1860s and ending in the late 19th century. The most conventional starting date is 1865, the year the Civil War ended. However, in his landmark monograph Reconstruction, historian Eric Foner dates the beginning of the Reconstruction of the South to 1863, starting with the Emancipation Proclamation, Port Royal Experiment, and the earnest debate of Reconstruction policies during the Civil War. Some other historians follow this 1863 periodization. 1861 has also been given as a starting date, interpreting Reconstruction as beginning "as soon as the Union captured territory in the Confederacy" and had early discourse about and experimentation  with Reconstruction policies. The conventional ending for Reconstruction is 1877, when the federal government withdrew the last troops stationed in the South as part of the Compromise of 1877. However, some scholars offer later dates, such as 1890, when Republicans failed to pass the Federal Elections Bill and secure black voters' rights.

Overview
As Confederate states came under control of the U.S. Army, President Abraham Lincoln set up reconstructed governments in Tennessee, Arkansas, and Louisiana during the war. A restored government of Virginia operated starting 1861 in parts of the state and also acted to create the new state of West Virginia. Lincoln experimented by giving land to black people in South Carolina. By fall 1865, new President Andrew Johnson declared the war goals of national unity and the ending of slavery achieved and Reconstruction completed. Republicans in Congress, refusing to accept Johnson's lenient terms, rejected and refused to seat new members of Congress, some of whom had been high-ranking Confederate officials a few months before. Johnson broke with the Republicans after vetoing two key bills that supported the Freedmen's Bureau and provided federal civil rights to the freedmen. The 1866 Congressional elections turned on the issue of Reconstruction, producing a sweeping Republican victory in the North and providing the Radical Republicans with sufficient control of Congress to override Johnson's vetoes and commence their own "Radical Reconstruction" in 1867. That same year, Congress removed civilian governments in the South and placed the former Confederacy under the rule of the U.S. Army (except in Tennessee, where anti-Johnson Republicans were already in control). The Army conducted new elections in which the freed slaves could vote, while Whites who had held leading positions under the Confederacy were temporarily denied the vote and were not permitted to run for office.

In 10 states, coalitions of freedmen, recent Black and White arrivals from the North, and White Southerners who supported Reconstruction cooperated to form Republican, biracial state governments. They introduced various Reconstruction programs including funding public schools, establishing charitable institutions, raising taxes, and funding public improvements such as improved railroad transportation and shipping.

In the 1860s and 1870s, the terms "Radical" and "conservative" had distinct meanings. "Conservative," used in a relativistic sense in regards to the context of the time period, was the name of a faction, often led by the planter class. Conservative opponents called the Republican regimes corrupt and instigated violence toward freedmen and Whites who supported Reconstruction. Most of the violence was carried out by members of the Ku Klux Klan (KKK), a secretive terrorist organization closely allied with the Southern Democratic Party. Klan members attacked and intimidated black people seeking to exercise their new civil rights, as well as Republican politicians in the South favoring those civil rights. One such politician murdered by the Klan on the eve of the 1868 presidential election was Republican Congressman James M. Hinds of Arkansas. Widespread violence in the South led to federal intervention by President Ulysses S. Grant in 1871, which suppressed the Klan. Nevertheless, White Democrats, calling themselves "Redeemers", regained control of the South state by state, sometimes using fraud and violence to control state elections. A deep national economic depression, which followed the Panic of 1873, led to major Democratic gains in the North, the collapse of many railroad schemes in the South, and a growing sense of frustration in the North.

The end of Reconstruction was a staggered process, and the period of Republican control ended at different times in different states. With the Compromise of 1877, military intervention in Southern politics ceased, and Republican control collapsed in the last three state governments in the South. This was followed by a period which White Southerners labeled "Redemption", during which White-dominated state legislatures enacted Jim Crow laws, disenfranchising most Black people and many poor Whites through a combination of constitutional amendments and election laws beginning in 1890. The White Southern Democrats' memory of Reconstruction played a major role in imposing the system of White supremacy and second-class citizenship for Black people using laws known as Jim Crow laws.

Three visions of Civil War memory appeared during Reconstruction:
 The reconciliationist vision was rooted in coping with the death and devastation the war had brought;
 the white supremacist vision demanded strict segregation of the races and the preservation of political and cultural domination of Blacks by Whites; any right to vote by Blacks was not to be countenanced; intimidation and violence were acceptable means to enforce the vision;
 the emancipationist vision sought full freedom, citizenship, male suffrage, and constitutional equality for African Americans.

Purpose
Reconstruction addressed how the 11 seceding rebel states in the South would regain what the Constitution calls a "republican form of government" and be re-seated in Congress, the civil status of the former leaders of the Confederacy, and the constitutional and legal status of freedmen, especially their civil rights and whether they should be given the right to vote. Intense controversy erupted throughout the South over these issues.

Passage of the 13th, 14th, and 15th Amendments is the constitutional legacy of Reconstruction. These Reconstruction Amendments established the rights that led to Supreme Court rulings in the mid-20th century that struck down school segregation. A "Second Reconstruction", sparked by the civil rights movement, led to civil-rights laws in 1964 and 1965 that ended legal segregation and re-opened the polls to Blacks.

The laws and constitutional amendments that laid the foundation for the most radical phase of Reconstruction were adopted from 1866 to 1871. By the 1870s, Reconstruction had officially provided freedmen with equal rights under the Constitution, and Blacks were voting and taking political office. Republican legislatures, coalitions of Whites and Blacks, established the first public school systems and numerous charitable institutions in the South. White paramilitary organizations, especially the Ku Klux Klan (KKK) as well as the White League and Red Shirts, formed with the political aim of driving out the Republicans. They also disrupted political organizing and terrorized Blacks to bar them from the polls. President Grant used federal power to effectively shut down the KKK in the early 1870s, though the other, smaller groups continued to operate. From 1873 to 1877, classically liberal, pro-civil service reform whites (calling themselves "Redeemers") regained power in the Southern states. They constituted the Bourbon wing of the national Democratic Party.

In the 1860s and 1870s, leaders who had been Whigs were committed to economic modernization, built around railroads, factories, banks, and cities. Most of the "Radical" Republicans in the North were men who believed in integrating African Americans by providing them civil rights as citizens, along with free enterprise; most were also modernizers and former Whigs. The "Liberal Republicans" of 1872 shared the same outlook except that they were especially opposed to the corruption they saw around President Grant, and believed that the goals of the Civil War had been achieved, and that the federal military intervention could now end.

Material devastation of the South in 1865

Reconstruction played out against an economy in ruins. The Confederacy in 1861 had 297 towns and cities, with a total population of 835,000 people; of these, 162, with 681,000 people, were at some point occupied by Union forces. 11 were destroyed or severely damaged by war action, including Atlanta (with an 1860 population of 9,600), Charleston, Columbia, and Richmond (with prewar populations of 40,500, 8,100, and 37,900, respectively); the 11 contained 115,900 people according to the 1860 Census, or 14% of the urban South. The number of people who lived in the destroyed towns represented just over 1% of the Confederacy's combined urban and rural populations. The rate of damage in smaller towns was much lower—only 45 courthouses were burned out of a total of 830.

Farms were in disrepair, and the prewar stock of horses, mules, and cattle was much depleted; 40% of the South's livestock had been killed. The South's farms were not highly mechanized, but the value of farm implements and machinery according to the 1860 Census was $81 million and was reduced by 40% by 1870. The transportation infrastructure lay in ruins, with little railroad or riverboat service available to move crops and animals to market. Railroad mileage was located mostly in rural areas; over two-thirds of the South's rails, bridges, rail yards, repair shops, and rolling stock were in areas reached by Union armies, which systematically destroyed what they could. Even in untouched areas, the lack of maintenance and repair, the absence of new equipment, the heavy over-use, and the deliberate relocation of equipment by the Confederates from remote areas to the war zone ensured the system would be ruined at war's end. Restoring the infrastructure—especially the railroad system—became a high priority for Reconstruction state governments.

The enormous cost of the Confederate war effort took a high toll on the South's economic infrastructure. The direct costs to the Confederacy in human capital, government expenditures, and physical destruction from the war totaled $3.3 billion. By early 1865, high inflation made the Confederate dollar worth little. When the war ended, Confederate currency and bank deposits were worth zero, making the banking system a near-total loss. People had to resort to bartering services for goods, or else try to obtain scarce Union dollars. With the emancipation of the Southern slaves, the entire economy of the South had to be rebuilt. Having lost their enormous investment in slaves, White plantation owners had minimal capital to pay freedmen workers to bring in crops. As a result, a system of sharecropping was developed, in which landowners broke up large plantations and rented small lots to the freedmen and their families. The main feature of the Southern economy changed from an elite minority of landed gentry slaveholders into a tenant farming agriculture system.

The end of the Civil War was accompanied by a large migration of new freed people to the cities. In the cities, Black people were relegated to the lowest paying jobs such as unskilled and service labor. Men worked as rail workers, rolling and lumber mills workers, and hotel workers. The large population of slave artisans during the antebellum period had not been translated into a large number of freedmen artisans during Reconstruction. Black women were largely confined to domestic work employed as cooks, maids, and child nurses. Others worked in hotels. A large number became laundresses. The dislocations had a severe negative impact on the Black population, with a large amount of sickness and death.

Over a quarter of Southern White men of military age—the backbone of the South's White workforce—died during the war, leaving countless families destitute. Per capita income for White Southerners declined from $125 in 1857 to a low of $80 in 1879. By the end of the 19th century and well into the 20th century, the South was locked into a system of poverty. How much of this failure was caused by the war and by previous reliance on agriculture remains the subject of debate among economists and historians.

Restoring the South to the Union

During the Civil War, the Radical Republican leaders argued that slavery and the Slave Power had to be permanently destroyed. Moderates said this could be easily accomplished as soon as the Confederate States Army surrendered and the Southern states repealed secession and accepted the Thirteenth Amendment–most of which happened by December 1865.

President Lincoln was the leader of the moderate Republicans and wanted to speed up Reconstruction and reunite the nation painlessly and quickly. Lincoln formally began Reconstruction on December 8, 1863, with his ten percent plan, which went into operation in several states but which Radical Republicans opposed.

1864: Wade–Davis Bill 

Lincoln broke with the Radicals in 1864. The Wade–Davis Bill of 1864 passed in Congress by the Radicals was designed to permanently disfranchise the Confederate element in the South. The bill asked the government to grant African American men the right to vote and that anyone who willingly gave weapons to the fight against the United States should be denied the right to vote. The bill required voters, fifty percent of white males, to take the "ironclad oath" swearing that they had never supported the Confederacy or been one of its soldiers. This oath also entailed having them to swear a loyalty to the Constitution and the Union before they could have state constitutional meetings. Lincoln blocked it. Pursuing a policy of "malice toward none" announced in his second inaugural address, Lincoln asked voters only to support the Union in the future, regardless of the past. Lincoln pocket vetoed the Wade–Davis Bill, which was much more strict than the ten percent plan.

Following Lincoln's veto, the Radicals lost support but regained strength after Lincoln's assassination in April 1865.

1865 
On January 16, 1865, General William Tecumseh Sherman issued Special Field Orders No. 15. It gave back about 400,000 confiscated acres of land in Georgia and South Carolina in plots of forty acres each to recently freed African American families and white southern Unionists. 

On April 9, 1865, General Robert E. Lee surrendered his Army of Northern Virginia to the Union Army under Ulysses S. Grant, effectively sealing the Confederacy's fate with the war concluding 6 weeks later. 

Upon Lincoln's assassination in April 1865, vice president Andrew Johnson became president. Radicals considered Johnson to be an ally, but upon becoming president, he rejected the Radical program of Reconstruction. He was on good terms with ex-Confederates in the South and ex-Copperheads in the North. He appointed his own governors and tried to close the Reconstruction process by the end of 1865. Thaddeus Stevens vehemently opposed Johnson's plans for an abrupt end to Reconstruction, insisting that Reconstruction must "revolutionize Southern institutions, habits, and manners .... The foundations of their institutions ... must be broken up and relaid, or all our blood and treasure have been spent in vain." Johnson broke decisively with the Republicans in Congress when he vetoed the Civil Rights Act on March 27, 1866. While Democrats celebrated, the Republicans rallied, passed the bill again, and overrode Johnson's repeat veto. Full-scale political warfare now existed between Johnson (now allied with the Democrats) and the Radical Republicans.

Since the war had ended, Congress rejected Johnson's argument that he had the war power to decide what to do. Congress decided it had the primary authority to decide how Reconstruction should proceed, because the Constitution stated the United States had to guarantee each state a republican form of government. The Radicals insisted that meant Congress decided how Reconstruction should be achieved. The issues were multiple: Who should decide, Congress or the president? How should republicanism operate in the South? What was the status of the former Confederate states? What was the citizenship status of the leaders of the Confederacy? What was the citizenship and suffrage status of freedmen?

After the war ended President Andrew Johnson gave back most of the land to the former white slave owners.

1866 
By 1866, the faction of Radical Republicans led by Congressman Thaddeus Stevens and Senator Charles Sumner was convinced that Johnson's Southern appointees were disloyal to the Union, hostile to loyal Unionists, and enemies of the Freedmen. Radicals used as evidence outbreaks of mob violence against Black people, such as the Memphis riots of 1866 and the New Orleans massacre of 1866. Radical Republicans demanded a prompt and strong federal response to protect freedmen and curb Southern racism.

Stevens and his followers viewed secession as having left the states in a status like new territories. Sumner argued that secession had destroyed statehood but the Constitution still extended its authority and its protection over individuals, as in existing U.S. territories. The Republicans sought to prevent Johnson's Southern politicians from "restoring the historical subordination of Negroes". Since slavery was abolished, the Three-fifths Compromise no longer applied to counting the population of Blacks. After the 1870 Census, the South would gain numerous additional representatives in Congress, based on the full population of freedmen. One Illinois Republican expressed a common fear that if the South were allowed to simply restore its previous established powers, that the "reward of treason will be an increased representation".

The election of 1866 decisively changed the balance of power, giving the Republicans two-thirds majorities in both houses of Congress, and enough votes to overcome Johnson's vetoes. They moved to impeach Johnson because of his constant attempts to thwart Radical Reconstruction measures, by using the Tenure of Office Act. Johnson was acquitted by one vote, but he lost the influence to shape Reconstruction policy. The Republican Congress established military districts in the South and used Army personnel to administer the region until new governments loyal to the Union—that accepted the Fourteenth Amendment and the right of freedmen to vote—could be established. Congress temporarily suspended the ability to vote of approximately 10,000 to 15,000 former Confederate officials and senior officers, while constitutional amendments gave full citizenship to all African Americans, and suffrage to the adult men.

With the power to vote, freedmen began participating in politics. While many enslaved people were illiterate, educated Blacks (including fugitive slaves) moved down from the North to aid them, and natural leaders also stepped forward. They elected White and Black men to represent them in constitutional conventions. A Republican coalition of freedmen, Southerners supportive of the Union (derisively called "scalawags" by White Democrats), and Northerners who had migrated to the South (derisively called "carpetbaggers")—some of whom were returning natives, but were mostly Union veterans—organized to create constitutional conventions. They created new state constitutions to set new directions for Southern states.

Suffrage

Congress had to consider how to restore to full status and representation within the Union those Southern states that had declared their independence from the United States and had withdrawn their representation. Suffrage for former Confederates was one of two main concerns. A decision needed to be made whether to allow just some or all former Confederates to vote (and to hold office). The moderates in Congress wanted virtually all of them to vote, but the Radicals resisted. They repeatedly imposed the ironclad oath, which would effectively have allowed no former Confederates to vote. Historian Harold Hyman says that in 1866 congressmen "described the oath as the last bulwark against the return of ex-rebels to power, the barrier behind which Southern Unionists and Negroes protected themselves".

Radical Republican leader Thaddeus Stevens proposed, unsuccessfully, that all former Confederates lose the right to vote for five years. The compromise that was reached disenfranchised many Confederate civil and military leaders. No one knows how many temporarily lost the vote, but one estimate placed the number as high as 10,000 to 15,000. However, Radical politicians took up the task at the state level. In Tennessee alone, over 80,000 former Confederates were disenfranchised.

Second, and closely related, was the issue of whether the 4 million freedmen were to be received as citizens: Would they be able to vote? If they were to be fully counted as citizens, some sort of representation for apportionment of seats in Congress had to be determined. Before the war, the population of slaves had been counted as three-fifths of a corresponding number of free Whites. By having 4 million freedmen counted as full citizens, the South would gain additional seats in Congress. If Blacks were denied the vote and the right to hold office, then only Whites would represent them. Many, including most white Southerners, Northern Democrats, and some Northern Republicans, opposed black voting. The small fraction of Republican voters opposed to black suffrage contributed to the defeats of several suffrage measures voted on in most Northern states. Some Northern states that had referendums on the subject limited the ability of their own small populations of Blacks to vote.

Lincoln had supported a middle position: to allow some Black men to vote, especially U.S. Army veterans. Johnson also believed that such service should be rewarded with citizenship. Lincoln proposed giving the vote to "the very intelligent, and especially those who have fought gallantly in our ranks". In 1864, Governor Johnson said: "The better class of them will go to work and sustain themselves, and that class ought to be allowed to vote, on the ground that a loyal Negro is more worthy than a disloyal white man."

As president in 1865, Johnson wrote to the man he appointed as governor of Mississippi, recommending: "If you could extend the elective franchise to all persons of color who can read the Constitution in English and write their names, and to all persons of color who own real estate valued at least two hundred and fifty dollars, and pay taxes thereon, you would completely disarm the adversary [Radicals in Congress], and set an example the other states will follow."

Charles Sumner and Thaddeus Stevens, leaders of the Radical Republicans, were initially hesitant to enfranchise the largely illiterate freedmen. Sumner preferred at first impartial requirements that would have imposed literacy restrictions on Blacks and Whites. He believed that he would not succeed in passing legislation to disenfranchise illiterate Whites who already had the vote.

In the South, many poor Whites were illiterate as there was almost no public education before the war. In 1880, for example, the White illiteracy rate was about 25% in Tennessee, Kentucky, Alabama, South Carolina, and Georgia, and as high as 33% in North Carolina. This compares with the 9% national rate, and a Black rate of illiteracy that was over 70% in the South. By 1900, however, with emphasis within the Black community on education, the majority of Blacks had achieved literacy.

Sumner soon concluded that "there was no substantial protection for the freedman except in the franchise". This was necessary, he stated, "(1) For his own protection; (2) For the protection of the white Unionist; and (3) For the peace of the country. We put the musket in his hands because it was necessary; for the same reason we must give him the franchise." The support for voting rights was a compromise between moderate and Radical Republicans.

The Republicans believed that the best way for men to get political experience was to be able to vote and to participate in the political system. They passed laws allowing all male freedmen to vote. In 1867, Black men voted for the first time. Over the course of Reconstruction, more than 1,500 African Americans held public office in the South; some of them were men who had escaped to the North and gained educations, and returned to the South. They did not hold office in numbers representative of their proportion in the population, but often elected Whites to represent them. The question of women's suffrage was also debated but was rejected. Women eventually gained the right to vote with the Nineteenth Amendment to the United States Constitution in 1920.

From 1890 to 1908, Southern states passed new state constitutions and laws that disenfranchised most Blacks and tens of thousands of poor Whites with new voter registration and electoral rules. When establishing new requirements such as subjectively administered literacy tests, in some states, they used "grandfather clauses" to enable illiterate Whites to vote.

Southern Treaty Commission
The Five Civilized Tribes that had been relocated to Indian Territory (now part of Oklahoma) held Black slaves and signed treaties supporting the Confederacy. During the war, a war among pro-Union and anti-Union Native Americans had raged. Congress passed a statute that gave the president the authority to suspend the appropriations of any tribe if the tribe is "in a state of actual hostility to the government of the United States ... and, by proclamation, to declare all treaties with such tribe to be abrogated by such tribe".

As a component of Reconstruction, the Interior Department ordered a meeting of representatives from all Indian tribes who had affiliated with the Confederacy. The council, the Southern Treaty Commission, was first held in Fort Smith, Arkansas in September 1865, and was attended by hundreds of Native Americans representing dozens of tribes. Over the next several years the commission negotiated treaties with tribes that resulted in additional re-locations to Indian Territory and the de facto creation (initially by treaty) of an unorganized Oklahoma Territory.

Lincoln's presidential Reconstruction

Preliminary events

President Lincoln signed two Confiscation Acts into law, the first on August 6, 1861, and the second on July 17, 1862, safeguarding fugitive slaves who crossed from the Confederacy across Union lines and giving them indirect emancipation if their masters continued insurrection against the United States. The laws allowed the confiscation of lands for colonization from those who aided and supported the rebellion. However, these laws had limited effect as they were poorly funded by Congress and poorly enforced by Attorney General Edward Bates.

In August 1861, Maj. Gen. John C. Frémont, Union commander of the Western Department, declared martial law in Missouri, confiscated Confederate property, and emancipated their slaves. President Lincoln immediately ordered Frémont to rescind his emancipation declaration, stating: "I think there is great danger that ... the liberating slaves of traitorous owners, will alarm our Southern Union friends, and turn them against us—perhaps ruin our fair prospect for Kentucky." After Frémont refused to rescind the emancipation order, President Lincoln terminated him from active duty on November 2, 1861. Lincoln was concerned that the border states would secede from the Union if slaves were given their freedom. On May 26, 1862, Union Maj. Gen. David Hunter emancipated slaves in South Carolina, Georgia, and Florida, declaring all "persons ... heretofore held as slaves ... forever free". Lincoln, embarrassed by the order, rescinded Hunter's declaration and canceled the emancipation.

On April 16, 1862, Lincoln signed a bill into law outlawing slavery in Washington, D.C., and freeing the estimated 3,500 slaves in the city. On June 19, 1862, he signed legislation outlawing slavery in all U.S. territories. On July 17, 1862, under the authority of the Confiscation Acts and an amended Force Bill of 1795, he authorized the recruitment of freed slaves into the U.S. Army and seizure of any Confederate property for military purposes.

Gradual emancipation and compensation
In an effort to keep border states in the Union, President Lincoln, as early as 1861, designed gradual compensated emancipation programs paid for by government bonds. Lincoln desired Delaware, Maryland, Kentucky, and Missouri to "adopt a system of gradual emancipation which should work the extinction of slavery in twenty years". On March 26, 1862, Lincoln met with Senator Charles Sumner and recommended that a special joint session of Congress be convened to discuss giving financial aid to any border states who initiated a gradual emancipation plan. In April 1862, the joint session of Congress met; however, the border states were not interested and did not make any response to Lincoln or any congressional emancipation proposal. Lincoln advocated compensated emancipation during the Hampton Roads Conference.

Colonization
In August 1862, President Lincoln met with African American leaders and urged them to colonize some place in Central America. Lincoln planned to free the Southern slaves in the Emancipation Proclamation and he was concerned that freedmen would not be well treated in the United States by Whites in both the North and South. Although Lincoln gave assurances that the United States government would support and protect any colonies that were established for former slaves, the leaders declined the offer of colonization. Many free Blacks had been opposed to colonization plans in the past because they wanted to remain in the United States. President Lincoln persisted in his colonization plan in the belief that emancipation and colonization were both part of the same program. By April 1863, Lincoln was successful in sending Black colonists to Haiti as well as 453 to Chiriqui in Central America; however, none of the colonies were able to remain self-sufficient. Frederick Douglass, a prominent 19th-century American civil rights activist, criticized Lincoln by stating that he was "showing all his inconsistencies, his pride of race and blood, his contempt for Negroes and his canting hypocrisy". African Americans, according to Douglass, wanted citizenship and civil rights rather than colonies. Historians are unsure if Lincoln gave up on the idea of African American colonization at the end of 1863 or if he actually planned to continue this policy up until 1865.

Installation of military governors
Starting in March 1862, in an effort to forestall Reconstruction by the Radicals in Congress, President Lincoln installed military governors in certain rebellious states under Union military control. Although the states would not be recognized by the Radicals until an undetermined time, installation of military governors kept the administration of Reconstruction under presidential control, rather than that of the increasingly unsympathetic Radical Congress. On March 3, 1862, Lincoln installed a loyalist Democrat, Senator Andrew Johnson, as military governor with the rank of brigadier general in his home state of Tennessee. In May 1862, Lincoln appointed Edward Stanly military governor of the coastal region of North Carolina with the rank of brigadier general. Stanly resigned almost a year later when he angered Lincoln by closing two schools for Black children in New Bern. After Lincoln installed Brigadier General George Foster Shepley as military governor of Louisiana in May 1862, Shepley sent two anti-slavery representatives, Benjamin Flanders and Michael Hahn, elected in December 1862, to the House, which capitulated and voted to seat them. In July 1862, Lincoln installed Colonel John S. Phelps as military governor of Arkansas, though he resigned soon after due to poor health.

Emancipation Proclamation

In July 1862, President Lincoln became convinced that "a military necessity" was needed to strike at slavery in order to win the Civil War for the Union. The Confiscation Acts were only having a minimal effect to end slavery. On July 22, he wrote a first draft of the Emancipation Proclamation that freed the slaves in states in rebellion. After he showed his Cabinet the document, slight alterations were made in the wording. Lincoln decided that the defeat of the Confederate invasion of the North at Sharpsburg was enough of a battlefield victory to enable him to release the preliminary Emancipation Proclamation that gave the rebels 100 days to return to the Union or the actual proclamation would be issued.

On January 1, 1863, the actual Emancipation Proclamation was issued, specifically naming 10 states in which slaves would be "forever free". The proclamation did not name the states of Tennessee, Kentucky, Missouri, Maryland, and Delaware, and specifically excluded numerous counties in some other states. Eventually, as the U.S. Army advanced into the Confederacy, millions of slaves were set free. Many of these freedmen joined the U.S. Army and fought in battles against the Confederate forces. Yet hundreds of thousands of freed slaves died during emancipation from illness that devastated army regiments. Freed slaves suffered from smallpox, yellow fever, and malnutrition.

Lincoln's 10% plan

President Abraham Lincoln was concerned to effect a speedy restoration of the Confederate states to the Union after the Civil War. In 1863, President Lincoln proposed a moderate plan for the Reconstruction of the captured Confederate state of Louisiana. The plan granted amnesty to rebels who took an oath of loyalty to the Union. Black freedmen workers were tied to labor on plantations for one year at a pay rate of $10 a month. Only 10% of the state's electorate had to take the loyalty oath in order for the state to be readmitted into the U.S. Congress. The state was required to abolish slavery in its new state constitution. Identical Reconstruction plans would be adopted in Arkansas and Tennessee. By December 1864, the Lincoln plan of Reconstruction had been enacted in Louisiana and the legislature sent two senators and five representatives to take their seats in Washington. However, Congress refused to count any of the votes from Louisiana, Arkansas, and Tennessee, in essence rejecting Lincoln's moderate Reconstruction plan. Congress, at this time controlled by the Radicals, proposed the Wade–Davis Bill that required a majority of the state electorates to take the oath of loyalty to be admitted to Congress. Lincoln pocket vetoed the bill and the rift widened between the moderates, who wanted to save the Union and win the war, and the Radicals, who wanted to effect a more complete change within Southern society. Frederick Douglass denounced Lincoln's 10% electorate plan as undemocratic since state admission and loyalty only depended on a minority vote.

Legalization of slave marriages
Before 1864, slave marriages had not been recognized legally; emancipation did not affect them. When freed, many made official marriages. Before emancipation, slaves could not enter into contracts, including the marriage contract. Not all free people formalized their unions. Some continued to have common-law marriages or community-recognized relationships. The acknowledgement of marriage by the state increased the state's recognition of freed people as legal actors and eventually helped make the case for parental rights for freed people against the practice of apprenticeship of Black children. These children were legally taken away from their families under the guise of "providing them with guardianship and 'good' homes until they reached the age of consent at twenty-one" under acts such as the Georgia 1866 Apprentice Act. Such children were generally used as sources of unpaid labor.

Freedmen's Bureau

On March 3, 1865, the Freedmen's Bureau Bill became law, sponsored by the Republicans to aid freedmen and White refugees. A federal bureau was created to provide food, clothing, fuel, and advice on negotiating labor contracts. It attempted to oversee new relations between freedmen and their former masters in a free labor market. The bureau was to expire one year after the termination of the war. Lincoln was assassinated before he could appoint a commissioner of the bureau.

With the help of the bureau, the recently freed slaves began voting, forming political parties, and assuming the control of labor in many areas. The bureau helped to start a change of power in the South that drew national attention from the Republicans in the North to the Democrats in the South. This is especially evident in the election between Grant and Seymour (Johnson did not get the Democratic nomination), where almost 700,000 Black voters voted and swayed the election 300,000 votes in Grant's favor.

Even with the benefits that it gave to the freedmen, the Freedmen's Bureau was unable to operate effectively in certain areas. Terrorizing freedmen for trying to vote, hold a political office, or own land, the Ku Klux Klan was the nemesis of the Freedmen's Bureau.

Bans color discrimination
Other legislation was signed that broadened equality and rights for African Americans. Lincoln outlawed discrimination on account of color, in carrying U.S. mail, in riding on public street cars in Washington, D.C., and in pay for soldiers.

February 1865 peace conference

Lincoln and Secretary of State William H. Seward met with three Southern representatives to discuss the peaceful Reconstruction of the Union and the Confederacy on February 3, 1865, in Hampton Roads, Virginia. The Southern delegation included Confederate Vice President Alexander H. Stephens, John Archibald Campbell, and Robert M. T. Hunter. The Southerners proposed the Union recognition of the Confederacy, a joint Union–Confederate attack on Mexico to oust Emperor Maximilian I, and an alternative subordinate status of servitude for Blacks rather than slavery. Lincoln flatly rejected recognition of the Confederacy, and said that the slaves covered by his Emancipation Proclamation would not be re-enslaved. He said that the Union states were about to pass the Thirteenth Amendment, outlawing slavery. Lincoln urged the governor of Georgia to remove Confederate troops and "ratify this constitutional amendment , so as to take effect—say in five years.... Slavery is doomed." Lincoln also urged compensated emancipation for the slaves as he thought the North should be willing to share the costs of freedom. Although the meeting was cordial, the parties did not settle on agreements.

Historical legacy debated
Lincoln continued to advocate his Louisiana Plan as a model for all states up until his assassination on April 15, 1865. The plan successfully started the Reconstruction process of ratifying the Thirteenth Amendment in all states. Lincoln is typically portrayed as taking the moderate position and fighting the Radical positions. There is considerable debate on how well Lincoln, had he lived, would have handled Congress during the Reconstruction process that took place after the Civil War ended. One historical camp argues that Lincoln's flexibility, pragmatism, and superior political skills with Congress would have solved Reconstruction with far less difficulty. The other camp believes that the Radicals would have attempted to impeach Lincoln, just as they did to his successor, Andrew Johnson, in 1868.

Johnson's presidential Reconstruction

Northern anger over the assassination of Lincoln and the immense human cost of the war led to demands for punitive policies. Vice President Andrew Johnson had taken a hard line and spoke of hanging Confederates, but when he succeeded Lincoln as president, Johnson took a much softer position, pardoning many Confederate leaders and other former Confederates. Former Confederate President Jefferson Davis was held in prison for two years, but other Confederate leaders were not. There were no trials on charges of treason. Only two people—Captain Henry Wirz, the commandant of the prison camp in Andersonville, Georgia, and guerilla leader Champ Ferguson—were ever executed for war crimes. Andrew Johnson's racist view of Reconstruction did not include the involvement of blacks in government, and he refused to heed Northern concerns when Southern state legislatures implemented Black Codes that set the status of the freedmen much lower than that of white people.

Smith argues that "Johnson attempted to carry forward what he considered to be Lincoln's plans for Reconstruction." McKitrick says that in 1865 Johnson had strong support in the Republican Party, saying: "It was naturally from the great moderate sector of Unionist opinion in the North that Johnson could draw his greatest comfort." Ray Allen Billington says: "One faction, the moderate Republicans under the leadership of Presidents Abraham Lincoln and Andrew Johnson, favored a mild policy toward the South." David A. Lincove, citing Lincoln biographers James G. Randall and Richard N. Current, argued that:

Historians generally agree that President Johnson was an inept politician who lost all his advantages by unskilled maneuvering. He broke with Congress in early 1866 and then became defiant and tried to block enforcement of Reconstruction laws passed by the U.S. Congress. He was in constant conflict constitutionally with the Radicals in Congress over the status of freedmen and whites in the defeated South. Although resigned to the abolition of slavery, many former Confederates were unwilling to accept both social changes and political domination by former slaves. In the words of Benjamin Franklin Perry, President Johnson's choice as the provisional governor of South Carolina: "First, the Negro is to be invested with all political power, and then the antagonism of interest between capital and labor is to work out the result."

However, the fears of the planter elite and other leading white citizens were partly assuaged by the actions of President Johnson, who ensured that a wholesale land redistribution from the planters to the freedmen did not occur. President Johnson ordered that confiscated or abandoned lands administered by the Freedmen's Bureau would not be redistributed to the freedmen but would be returned to pardoned owners. Land was returned that would have been forfeited under the Confiscation Acts passed by Congress in 1861 and 1862.

Freedmen and the enactment of Black Codes

Southern state governments quickly enacted the restrictive "Black Codes". However, they were abolished in 1866 and seldom had effect, because the Freedmen's Bureau (not the local courts) handled the legal affairs of freedmen.

The Black Codes indicated the plans of the Southern whites for the former slaves. The freedmen would have more rights than did free Blacks before the war, but they would still have only second-class civil rights, no voting rights, and no citizenship. They could not own firearms, serve on a jury in a lawsuit involving whites, or move about without employment. The Black Codes outraged Northern opinion. They were overthrown by the Civil Rights Act of 1866 that gave the freedmen more legal equality (although still without the right to vote).

The freedmen, with the strong backing of the Freedmen's Bureau, rejected gang labor work patterns that had been used in slavery. Instead of gang labor, freed people preferred family-based labor groups. They forced planters to bargain for their labor. Such bargaining soon led to the establishment of the system of sharecropping, which gave the freedmen greater economic independence and social autonomy than gang labor. However, because they lacked capital and the planters continued to own the means of production (tools, draft animals, and land), the freedmen were forced into producing cash crops (mainly cotton) for the land-owners and merchants, and they entered into a crop-lien system. Widespread poverty, disruption to an agricultural economy too dependent on cotton, and the falling price of cotton, led within decades to the routine indebtedness of the majority of the freedmen, and the poverty of many planters.

Northern officials gave varying reports on conditions for the freedmen in the South. One harsh assessment came from Carl Schurz, who reported on the situation in the states along the Gulf Coast. His report documented dozens of extrajudicial killings and claimed that hundreds or thousands more African Americans were killed:

The report included sworn testimony from soldiers and officials of the Freedmen's Bureau. In Selma, Alabama, Major J. P. Houston noted that whites who killed 12 African Americans in his district never came to trial. Many more killings never became official cases. Captain Poillon described white patrols in southwestern Alabama:

Much of the violence that was perpetrated against African Americans was shaped by gender prejudices regarding African Americans. Black women were in a particularly vulnerable situation. To convict a white man of sexually assaulting Black women in this period was exceedingly difficult. The South's judicial system had been wholly refigured to make one of its primary purposes the coercion of African Americans to comply with the social customs and labor demands of whites.Trials were discouraged and attorneys for Black misdemeanor defendants were difficult to find. The goal of county courts was a fast, uncomplicated trial with a resulting conviction. Most Blacks were unable to pay their fines or bail, and "the most common penalty was nine months to a year in a slave mine or lumber camp". The South's judicial system was rigged to generate fees and claim bounties, not to ensure public protection. Black women were socially perceived as sexually avaricious and since they were portrayed as having little virtue, society held that they could not be raped. One report indicates two freed women, Frances Thompson and Lucy Smith, describe their violent sexual assault during the Memphis Riots of 1866. However, Black women were vulnerable even in times of relative normalcy. Sexual assaults on African-American women were so pervasive, particularly on the part of their white employers, that Black men sought to reduce the contact between white males and Black females by having the women in their family avoid doing work that was closely overseen by whites. Black men were construed as being extremely sexually aggressive and their supposed or rumored threats to white women were often used as a pretext for lynching and castrations.

Moderate responses
During fall 1865, out of response to the Black Codes and worrisome signs of Southern recalcitrance, the Radical Republicans blocked the readmission of the former rebellious states to the Congress. Johnson, however, was content with allowing former Confederate states into the Union as long as their state governments adopted the Thirteenth Amendment abolishing slavery. By December 6, 1865, the amendment was ratified and Johnson considered Reconstruction over. Johnson was following the moderate Lincoln presidential Reconstruction policy to get the states readmitted as soon as possible.

Congress, however, controlled by the Radicals, had other plans. The Radicals were led by Charles Sumner in the Senate and Thaddeus Stevens in the House of Representatives. Congress, on December 4, 1865, rejected Johnson's moderate presidential Reconstruction, and organized the Joint Committee on Reconstruction, a 15-member panel to devise Reconstruction requirements for the Southern states to be restored to the Union.

In January 1866, Congress renewed the Freedmen's Bureau; however, Johnson vetoed the Freedmen's Bureau Bill in February 1866. Although Johnson had sympathy for the plight of the freedmen, he was against federal assistance. An attempt to override the veto failed on February 20, 1866. This veto shocked the congressional Radicals. In response, both the Senate and House passed a joint resolution not to allow any senator or representative seat admittance until Congress decided when Reconstruction was finished.

Senator Lyman Trumbull of Illinois, leader of the moderate Republicans, took affront to the Black Codes. He proposed the first Civil Rights Act, because the abolition of slavery was empty if:

The key to the bill was the opening section:

The bill did not give freedmen the right to vote. Congress quickly passed the Civil Rights Bill; the Senate on February 2 voted 33–12; the House on March 13 voted 111–38.

Johnson's vetoes

Although strongly urged by moderates in Congress to sign the Civil Rights bill, Johnson broke decisively with them by vetoing it on March 27, 1866. His veto message objected to the measure because it conferred citizenship on the freedmen at a time when 11 out of 36 states were unrepresented and attempted to fix by federal law "a perfect equality of the white and black races in every state of the Union". Johnson said it was an invasion by federal authority of the rights of the states; it had no warrant in the Constitution and was contrary to all precedents. It was a "stride toward centralization and the concentration of all legislative power in the national government".

The Democratic Party, proclaiming itself the party of white men, North and South, supported Johnson. However, the Republicans in Congress overrode his veto (the Senate by the close vote of 33–15, and the House by 122–41) and the civil rights bill became law. Congress also passed a watered-down Freedmen's Bureau bill; Johnson quickly vetoed as he had done to the previous bill. Once again, however, Congress had enough support and overrode Johnson's veto.

The last moderate proposal was the Fourteenth Amendment, whose principal drafter was Representative John Bingham. It was designed to put the key provisions of the Civil Rights Act into the Constitution, but it went much further. It extended citizenship to everyone born in the United States (except Indians on reservations), penalized states that did not give the vote to freedmen, and most important, created new federal civil rights that could be protected by federal courts. It guaranteed the federal war debt would be paid (and promised the Confederate debt would never be paid). Johnson used his influence to block the amendment in the states since three-fourths of the states were required for ratification (the amendment was later ratified). The moderate effort to compromise with Johnson had failed, and a political fight broke out between the Republicans (both Radical and moderate) on one side, and on the other side, Johnson and his allies in the Democratic Party in the North, and the groupings (which used different names) in each Southern state.

Congressional Reconstruction

Concerned that President Johnson viewed Congress as an "illegal body" and wanted to overthrow the government, Republicans in Congress took control of Reconstruction policies after the election of 1866. Johnson ignored the policy mandate, and he openly encouraged Southern states to deny ratification of the Fourteenth Amendment (except for Tennessee, all former Confederate states did refuse to ratify, as did the border states of Delaware, Maryland, and Kentucky). Radical Republicans in Congress, led by Stevens and Sumner, opened the way to suffrage for male freedmen. They were generally in control, although they had to compromise with the moderate Republicans (the Democrats in Congress had almost no power). Historians refer to this period as "Radical Reconstruction" or "congressional Reconstruction". The business spokesmen in the North generally opposed Radical proposals. Analysis of 34 major business newspapers showed that 12 discussed politics, and only one, Iron Age, supported radicalism. The other 11 opposed a "harsh" Reconstruction policy, favored the speedy return of the Southern states to congressional representation, opposed legislation designed to protect the freedmen, and deplored the impeachment of President Andrew Johnson.

The South's White leaders, who held power in the immediate post-bellum era before the vote was granted to the freedmen, renounced secession and slavery, but not White supremacy. People who had previously held power were angered in 1867 when new elections were held. New Republican lawmakers were elected by a coalition of White Unionists, freedmen and Northerners who had settled in the South. Some leaders in the South tried to accommodate new conditions.

Constitutional amendments
Three constitutional amendments, known as the Reconstruction amendments, were adopted. The Thirteenth Amendment abolishing slavery was ratified in 1865. The Fourteenth Amendment was proposed in 1866 and ratified in 1868, guaranteeing United States citizenship to all persons born or naturalized in the United States and granting them federal civil rights. The Fifteenth Amendment, proposed in late February 1869, and passed in early February 1870, decreed that the right to vote could not be denied because of "race, color, or previous condition of servitude". Left unaffected was that states would still determine voter registration and electoral laws. The amendments were directed at ending slavery and providing full citizenship to freedmen. Northern congressmen believed that providing Black men with the right to vote would be the most rapid means of political education and training.

Many Blacks took an active part in voting and political life, and rapidly continued to build churches and community organizations. Following Reconstruction, White Democrats and insurgent groups used force to regain power in the state legislatures, and pass laws that effectively disenfranchised most Blacks and many poor Whites in the South. From 1890 to 1910, Southern states passed new state constitutions that completed the disenfranchisement of Blacks. U.S. Supreme Court rulings on these provisions upheld many of these new Southern state constitutions and laws, and most Blacks were prevented from voting in the South until the 1960s. Full federal enforcement of the Fourteenth and Fifteenth Amendments did not reoccur until after passage of legislation in the mid-1960s as a result of the civil rights movement.

For details, see:

 Redeemers
 Disfranchisement after the Reconstruction era
 Jim Crow laws
 United States v. Cruikshank (1875), related to the Colfax Massacre
 Posse Comitatus Act (1878)
 Civil Rights Cases (1883)
 Civil rights movement (1896–1954)
 Plessy v. Ferguson (1896)
 Williams v. Mississippi (1898)
 Giles v. Harris (1903)

Statutes
The Reconstruction Acts as originally passed, were initially called "An act to provide for the more efficient Government of the Rebel States" The legislation was enacted by the 39th Congress, on March 2, 1867. It was vetoed by President Johnson, and the veto then overridden by a two-thirds majority, in both the House and the Senate, the same day. Congress also clarified the scope of the federal writ of habeas corpus, to allow federal courts to vacate unlawful state court convictions or sentences, in 1867.

Military Reconstruction

With the Radicals in control, Congress passed the Reconstruction Acts on July 19, 1867. The first Reconstruction Act, authored by Oregon Sen. George Henry Williams, a Radical Republican, placed 10 of the former Confederate states—all but Tennessee—under military control, grouping them into five military districts:
 First Military District: Virginia, under General John Schofield
 Second Military District: North Carolina and South Carolina, under General Daniel Sickles
 Third Military District: Georgia, Alabama, and Florida, under Generals John Pope and George Meade
 Fourth Military District: Arkansas and Mississippi, under General Edward Ord
 Fifth Military District: Texas and Louisiana, under Generals Philip Sheridan and Winfield Scott Hancock

20,000 U.S. troops were deployed to enforce the act.

The five border states that had not joined the Confederacy were not subject to military Reconstruction. West Virginia, which had seceded from Virginia in 1863, and Tennessee, which had already been re-admitted in 1866, were not included in the military districts. Federal troops however were kept in West Virginia through 1868 in order to control civil unrest in several areas throughout the state. Federal troops were removed from Kentucky and Missouri in 1866.

The 10 Southern state governments were re-constituted under the direct control of the United States Army. One major purpose was to recognize and protect the right of African Americans to vote. There was little to no combat, but rather a state of martial law in which the military closely supervised local government, supervised elections, and tried to protect office holders and freedmen from violence. Blacks were enrolled as voters; former Confederate leaders were excluded for a limited period. No one state was entirely representative. Randolph Campbell describes what happened in Texas:

State constitutional conventions: 1867–1869
The 11 Southern states held constitutional conventions giving Black men the right to vote, where the factions divided into the Radical, "conservative," and in-between delegates. The Radicals were a coalition: 40% were Southern White Republicans; 25% were White and 34% were Black. In addition to expanding the franchise, they pressed for provisions designed to promote economic growth, especially financial aid to rebuild the ruined railroad system. The conventions set up systems of free public schools funded by tax dollars, but did not require them to be racially integrated.

Until 1872, most former Confederate or prewar Southern office holders were disqualified from voting or holding office; all but 500 top Confederate leaders were pardoned by the Amnesty Act of 1872. "Proscription" was the policy of disqualifying as many ex-Confederates as possible. For example, in 1865 Tennessee had disenfranchised 80,000 ex-Confederates. However, proscription was soundly rejected by the Black element, which insisted on universal suffrage. The issue would come up repeatedly in several states, especially in Texas and Virginia. In Virginia, an effort was made to disqualify for public office every man who had served in the Confederate Army even as a private, and any civilian farmer who sold food to the Confederate States Army. Disenfranchising Southern Whites was also opposed by moderate Republicans in the North, who felt that ending proscription would bring the South closer to a republican form of government based on the consent of the governed, as called for by the Constitution and the Declaration of Independence. Strong measures that were called for in order to forestall a return to the defunct Confederacy increasingly seemed out of place, and the role of the United States Army and controlling politics in the state was troublesome. Historian Mark Summers states that increasingly "the disenfranchisers had to fall back on the contention that denial of the vote was meant as punishment, and a lifelong punishment at that ... Month by month, the un-republican character of the regime looked more glaring."

Election of 1868

During the Civil War, many in the North believed that fighting for the Union was a noble cause–for the preservation of the Union and the end of slavery. After the war ended, with the North victorious, the fear among Radicals was that President Johnson too quickly assumed that slavery and Confederate nationalism were dead and that the Southern states could return. The Radicals sought out a candidate for president who represented their viewpoint.

In May 1868, the Republicans unanimously chose Ulysses S. Grant as their presidential candidate, and Schuyler Colfax, as their vice-presidential candidate. Grant won favor with the Radicals after he allowed Edwin Stanton, a Radical, to be reinstated as secretary of war. As early as 1862, during the Civil War, Grant had appointed the Ohio military chaplain John Eaton to protect and gradually incorporate refugee slaves in west Tennessee and northern Mississippi into the Union war effort and pay them for their labor. It was the beginning of his vision for the Freedmen's Bureau. Grant opposed President Johnson by supporting the Reconstruction Acts passed by the Radicals.

In northern cities Grant contended with a strong immigrant, and particularly in New York City an Irish, anti-Reconstructionist Democratic bloc. Republicans sought to make inroads campaigning for the Irish taken prisoner in the Fenian raids into Canada, and calling on the Johnson administration to recognize a lawful state of war between Ireland and England. In 1867 Grant personally intervened with David Bell and Michael Scanlon to move their paper, the Irish Republic, articulate in its support for black equality, to New York from Chicago.

The Democrats, having abandoned Johnson, nominated former governor Horatio Seymour of New York for president and Francis P. Blair of Missouri for vice president. The Democrats advocated the immediate restoration of former Confederate states to the Union and amnesty from "all past political offenses".

Grant won the popular vote by 300,000 votes out of 5,716,082 votes cast, receiving an Electoral College landslide of 214 votes to Seymour's 80. Seymour received a majority of white votes, but Grant was aided by 500,000 votes cast by blacks, winning him 52.7 percent of the popular vote. He lost Louisiana and Georgia primarily due to Ku Klux Klan violence against African-American voters. At the age of 46, Grant was the youngest president yet elected, and the first president after the nation had outlawed slavery.

Grant's presidential Reconstruction

Effective civil rights executive
President Ulysses S. Grant was considered an effective civil rights executive, concerned about the plight of African Americans.  Grant met with prominent black leaders for consultation and signed a bill into law, on March 18, 1869, that guaranteed equal rights to both blacks and whites, to serve on juries, and hold office, in Washington D.C. In 1870 Grant signed into law a Naturalization Act that opened a path to citizenship for foreign-born Black residents in the US. Additionally, Grant's Postmaster General, John Creswell used his patronage powers to integrate the postal system and appointed a record number of African-American men and women as postal workers across the nation, while also expanding many of the mail routes. Grant appointed Republican abolitionist and champion of black education Hugh Lennox Bond as U.S. Circuit Court judge.

Final four Reconstruction states admitted
Immediately upon inauguration in 1869, Grant bolstered Reconstruction by prodding Congress to readmit Virginia, Mississippi, and Texas into the Union, while ensuring their state constitutions protected every citizen's voting rights.

Grant advocated the ratification of the Fifteenth Amendment that said states could not disenfranchise African Americans. Within a year, the three remaining states—Mississippi, Virginia, and Texas—adopted the new amendment—and were admitted to Congress. Grant put military pressure on Georgia to reinstate its black legislators and adopt the new amendment. Georgia complied, and on February 24, 1871, its senators were seated in Congress, with all the former Confederate states represented. Southern Reconstructed states were controlled by Republicans and former slaves. By 1877 the Democratic Party had full control of the region and Reconstruction was dead.

Department of Justice created
In 1870, to enforce Reconstruction, Congress and Grant created the Justice Department that allowed the Attorney General Amos Akerman and the first Solicitor General Benjamin Bristow to prosecute the Klan. In Grant's two terms he strengthened Washington's legal capabilities to directly intervene to protect citizenship rights even if the states ignored the problem.

Enforcement Acts (1870–1871)
Congress and Grant passed a series (three) of powerful civil rights Enforcement Acts between 1870 and 1871, designed to protect blacks and Reconstruction governments. These were criminal codes that protected the freedmen's right to vote, to hold office, to serve on juries, and receive equal protection of laws. Most important, they authorized the federal government to intervene when states did not act. Urged by Grant and his Attorney General Amos T. Akerman, the strongest of these laws was the Ku Klux Klan Act, passed on April 20, 1871, that authorized the president to impose martial law and suspend the writ of habeas corpus.

Grant was so adamant about the passage of the Ku Klux Klan Act, he earlier had sent a message to Congress, on March 23, 1871, in which he said:

Grant also recommended the enforcement of laws in all parts of the United States to protect life, liberty, and property.

Prosecution of the Ku Klux Klan

Grant's Justice Department destroyed the Ku Klux Klan, but during both of his terms, Blacks lost their political strength in the Southern United States. By October, Grant suspended habeas corpus in part of South Carolina and he also sent federal troops to help marshals, who initiated prosecutions of Klan members. Grant's Attorney General, Amos T. Akerman, who replaced Hoar, was zealous in his attempt to destroy the Klan. Akerman and South Carolina's U.S. marshal arrested over 470 Klan members, but hundreds of Klansmen, including the Klan's wealthy leaders, fled the state. Akerman returned over 3,000 indictments of the Klan throughout the South and obtained 600 convictions for the worst offenders. By 1872, Grant had crushed the Klan, and African Americans peacefully voted in record numbers in elections in the South. Attorney General George H. Williams, Akerman's replacement, suspended his prosecutions of the Klan in North Carolina and South Carolina in the Spring of 1873, but prior to the election of 1874, he changed course and prosecuted the Klan. Civil rights prosecutions continued but with fewer yearly cases and convictions.

Amnesty Act of 1872
In addition to fighting for African American civil rights, Grant wanted to reconcile with white southerners, out of a spirit of Appomattox. To placate the South, in May 1872, Grant signed the Amnesty Act, which restored political rights to former Confederates, except for a few hundred former Confederate officers. Grant wanted people to vote and practice free speech despite their "views, color or nativity."

Civil Rights Act of 1875
The Civil Rights Act of 1875 was one of the last major acts of Congress and Grant to preserve Reconstruction and equality for African Americans. The initial bill was created by Senator Charles Sumner. Grant endorsed the measure, despite his previous feud with Sumner, signing it into law on March 1, 1875. The law, ahead of its times, outlawed discrimination for blacks in public accommodations, schools, transportation, and selecting juries. Although weakly enforceable, the law spread fear among whites opposed to interracial justice and was overturned by the Supreme Court in 1883. The later enforceable Civil Rights Act of 1964 borrowed many of the earlier 1875's law's provisions.

Countered election fraud
To counter vote fraud in the Democratic stronghold of New York City, Grant sent in tens of thousands of armed, uniformed federal marshals and other election officials to regulate the 1870 and subsequent elections. Democrats across the North then mobilized to defend their base and attacked Grant's entire set of policies. On October 21, 1876, President Grant deployed troops to protect Black and White Republican voters in Petersburg, Virginia.

National support of Reconstruction declines
Grant's support from Congress and the nation declined due to scandals within his administration and the political resurgence of the Democrats in the North and South. Anti-Reconstruction whites claimed that wealthy white landowners had lost power, and they blamed governmental scandals in the South on it. Meanwhile, white northern Republicans were becoming more conservative. Republicans and Black Americans lost power in the South. By 1870, most Republicans felt the war goals had been achieved, and they turned their attention to other issues such as economic policies. White Americans were in almost full control again by the start of the 1900s and did not enforce Black voting rights. The United States government eventually pulled all its troops from the Southern states.

African American officeholders
Republicans took control of all Southern state governorships and state legislatures, except for Virginia. The Republican coalition elected numerous African Americans to local, state, and national offices; though they did not dominate any electoral offices, Black men as representatives voting in state and federal legislatures marked a drastic social change. At the beginning of 1867, no African American in the South held political office, but within three or four years "about 15 percent of the officeholders in the South were Black—a larger proportion than in 1990". Most of those offices were at the local level. In 1860, Blacks constituted the majority of the population in Mississippi and South Carolina, 47% in Louisiana, 45% in Alabama, and 44% in Georgia and Florida, so their political influence was still far less than their percentage of the population.

About 137 Black officeholders had lived outside the South before the Civil War. Some who had escaped from slavery to the North and had become educated returned to help the South advance in the postbellum era. Others were free people of color before the war, who had achieved education and positions of leadership elsewhere. Other African American men elected to office were already leaders in their communities, including a number of preachers. As happened in White communities, not all leadership depended upon wealth and literacy.

There were few African Americans elected or appointed to national office. African Americans voted for both White and Black candidates. The Fifteenth Amendment to the United States Constitution guaranteed only that voting could not be restricted on the basis of race, color, or previous condition of servitude. From 1868 on, campaigns and elections were surrounded by violence as White insurgents and paramilitaries tried to suppress the Black vote, and fraud was rampant. Many white southerners who had been proslavery were angry with governments that had African Americans in office. Furious white Southerners told the rumor that Reconstruction was secretly promoting Black Americans full control over whites. Many congressional elections in the South were contested. Even states with majority-African-American populations often elected only one or two African American representatives to Congress. Exceptions included South Carolina; at the end of Reconstruction, four of its five congressmen were African Americans.

Social and economic factors

Religion

Freedmen were very active in forming their own churches, mostly Baptist or Methodist, and giving their ministers both moral and political leadership roles. In a process of self-segregation, practically all Blacks left White churches so that few racially integrated congregations remained (apart from some Catholic churches in Louisiana). They started many new Black Baptist churches and soon, new Black state associations.

Four main groups competed with each other across the South to form new Methodist churches composed of freedmen. They were the African Methodist Episcopal Church; the African Methodist Episcopal Zion Church, both independent Black denominations founded in Philadelphia and New York, respectively; the Colored Methodist Episcopal Church (which was sponsored by the White Methodist Episcopal Church, South) and the well-funded Methodist Episcopal Church (predominantly White Methodists of the North). The Methodist Church had split before the war due to disagreements about slavery. By 1871, the Northern Methodists had 88,000 Black members in the South, and had opened numerous schools for them.

Blacks in the South made up a core element of the Republican Party. Their ministers had powerful political roles that were distinctive since they did not depend on White support, in contrast to teachers, politicians, businessmen, and tenant farmers. Acting on the principle as stated by Charles H. Pearce, an AME minister in Florida: "A man in this state cannot do his whole duty as a minister except he looks out for the political interests of his people." More than 100 Black ministers were elected to state legislatures during Reconstruction, as well as several to Congress and one, Hiram Rhodes Revels, to the U.S. Senate.

In a highly controversial action during the war, the Northern Methodists used the Army to seize control of Methodist churches in large cities, over the vehement protests of the Southern Methodists. Historian Ralph Morrow reports:

Across the North, several denominations—especially the Methodists, Congregationalists, and Presbyterians, as well as the Quakers—strongly supported Radical policies. The focus on social problems paved the way for the Social Gospel movement. Matthew Simpson, a Methodist bishop, played a leading role in mobilizing the Northern Methodists for the cause. Biographer Robert D. Clark called him the "High Priest of the Radical Republicans". The Methodist Ministers Association of Boston, meeting two weeks after Lincoln's assassination, called for a hard line against the Confederate leadership:

The denominations all sent missionaries, teachers and activists to the South to help the freedmen. Only the Methodists made many converts, however. Activists sponsored by the Northern Methodist Church played a major role in the Freedmen's Bureau, notably in such key educational roles as the bureau's state superintendent or assistant superintendent of education for Virginia, Florida, Alabama, and South Carolina.

Many Americans interpreted great events in religious terms. Historian Wilson Fallin Jr. contrasts the interpretation of the Civil War and Reconstruction in White versus Black Baptist sermons in Alabama. White Baptists expressed the view that:

In sharp contrast, Black Baptists interpreted the Civil War, emancipation, and Reconstruction as:

Public schools
Historian James D. Anderson argues that the freed slaves were the first Southerners "to campaign for universal, state-supported public education". Blacks in the Republican coalition played a critical role in establishing the principle in state constitutions for the first time during congressional Reconstruction. Some slaves had learned to read from White playmates or colleagues before formal education was allowed by law; African Americans started "native schools" before the end of the war; Sabbath schools were another widespread means that freedmen developed to teach literacy. When they gained suffrage, Black politicians took this commitment to public education to state constitutional conventions.

The Republicans created a system of public schools, which were segregated by race everywhere except New Orleans. Generally, elementary and a few secondary schools were built in most cities, and occasionally in the countryside, but the South had few cities.

The rural areas faced many difficulties opening and maintaining public schools. In the country, the public school was often a one-room affair that attracted about half the younger children. The teachers were poorly paid, and their pay was often in arrears. Conservatives contended the rural schools were too expensive and unnecessary for a region where the vast majority of people were cotton or tobacco farmers. They had no expectation of better education for their residents. One historian found that the schools were less effective than they might have been because "poverty, the inability of the states to collect taxes, and inefficiency and corruption in many places prevented successful operation of the schools". After Reconstruction ended and White elected officials disenfranchised Blacks and imposed Jim Crow laws, they consistently underfunded Black institutions, including the schools.

After the war, Northern missionaries founded numerous private academies and colleges for freedmen across the South. In addition, every state founded state colleges for freedmen, such as Alcorn State University in Mississippi. The normal schools and state colleges produced generations of teachers who were integral to the education of African American children under the segregated system. By the end of the century, the majority of African Americans were literate.

In the late 19th century, the federal government established land grant legislation to provide funding for higher education across the United States. Learning that Blacks were excluded from land grant colleges in the South, in 1890 the federal government insisted that Southern states establish Black state institutions as land grant colleges to provide for Black higher education, in order to continue to receive funds for their already established White schools. Some states classified their Black state colleges as land grant institutions. Former Congressman John Roy Lynch wrote: "there are very many liberal, fair-minded and influential Democrats in the state [Mississippi] who are strongly in favor of having the state provide for the liberal education of both races".

According to a 2020 study by economist Trevon Logan, increases in Black politicians led to greater tax revenue, which was put towards public education spending (and land tenancy reforms). Logan finds that this led to greater literacy among Black men.

Railroad subsidies and payoffs

Every Southern state subsidized railroads, which modernizers believed could haul the South out of isolation and poverty. Millions of dollars in bonds and subsidies were fraudulently pocketed. One ring in North Carolina spent $200,000 in bribing the legislature and obtained millions of state dollars for its railroads. Instead of building new track, however, it used the funds to speculate in bonds, reward friends with extravagant fees, and enjoy lavish trips to Europe. Taxes were quadrupled across the South to pay off the railroad bonds and the school costs.

There were complaints among taxpayers because taxes had historically been low, as the planter elite was not committed to public infrastructure or public education. Taxes historically had been much lower in the South than in the North, reflecting the lack of government investment by the communities. The lines were owned and directed overwhelmingly by Northerners. Railroads helped create a mechanically skilled group of craftsmen and broke the isolation of much of the region. Passengers were few, however, and apart from hauling the cotton crop when it was harvested, there was little freight traffic. As Franklin explains: "numerous railroads fed at the public trough by bribing legislators ... and through the use and misuse of state funds". According to one businessman, the effect "was to drive capital from the state, paralyze industry, and demoralize labor".

Taxation during Reconstruction
Reconstruction changed the means of taxation in the South. In the U.S. from the earliest days until today, a major source of state revenue was the property tax. In the South, wealthy landowners were allowed to self-assess the value of their own land. These fraudulent assessments were almost valueless, and pre-war property tax collections were lacking due to property value misrepresentation. State revenues came from fees and from sales taxes on slave auctions. Some states assessed property owners by a combination of land value and a capitation tax, a tax on each worker employed. This tax was often assessed in a way to discourage a free labor market, where a slave was assessed at 75 cents, while a free White was assessed at a dollar or more, and a free African American at $3 or more. Some revenue also came from poll taxes. These taxes were more than poor people could pay, with the designed and inevitable consequence that they did not vote.

During Reconstruction, the state legislature mobilized to provide for public need more than had previous governments: establishing public schools and investing in infrastructure, as well as charitable institutions such as hospitals and asylums. They set out to increase taxes which were unusually low. The planters had provided privately for their own needs. There was some fraudulent spending in the postbellum years; a collapse in state credit because of huge deficits, forced the states to increase property tax rates. In places, the rate went up to 10 times higher—despite the poverty of the region. The planters had not invested in infrastructure and much had been destroyed during the war. In part, the new tax system was designed to force owners of large plantations with huge tracts of uncultivated land either to sell or to have it confiscated for failure to pay taxes. The taxes would serve as a market-based system for redistributing the land to the landless freedmen and White poor. Mississippi, for instance, was mostly frontier, with 90% of the bottom lands in the interior undeveloped.

The following table shows property tax rates for South Carolina and Mississippi. Note that many local town and county assessments effectively doubled the tax rates reported in the table. These taxes were still levied upon the landowners' own sworn testimony as to the value of their land, which remained the dubious and exploitable system used by wealthy landholders in the South well into the 20th century.

Called upon to pay taxes on their property, essentially for the first time, angry plantation owners revolted. The conservatives shifted their focus away from race to taxes. Former Congressman John R. Lynch, a Black Republican leader from Mississippi, later wrote:

National financial issues 

The Civil War had been financed primarily by issuing short-term and long-term bonds and loans, plus inflation caused by printing paper money, plus new taxes. Wholesale prices had more than doubled, and reduction of inflation was a priority for Secretary McCulloch. A high priority, and by far the most controversial, was the currency question. The old paper currency issued by state banks had been withdrawn, and Confederate currency was worthless. The national banks had issued $207 million in currency, which was backed by gold and silver. The federal treasury had issued $428 million in greenbacks, which was legal tender but not backed by gold or silver. In addition about $275 million of coin was in circulation. The new administration policy announced in October would be to make all the paper convertible into specie, if Congress so voted. The House of Representatives passed the Alley Resolution on December 18, 1865, by a vote of 144 to 6. In the Senate it was a different matter, for the key player was Senator John Sherman, who said that inflation contraction was not nearly as important as refunding the short-term and long-term national debt. The war had been largely financed by national debt, in addition to taxation and inflation. The national debt stood at $2.8 billion. By October 1865, most of it in short-term and temporary loans. Wall Street bankers typified by Jay Cooke believe that the economy was about to grow rapidly, thanks to the development of agriculture through the Homestead Act, the expansion of railroads, especially rebuilding the devastated Southern railroads and opening the transcontinental railroad line to the West Coast, and especially the flourishing of manufacturing during the war. The gold premium over greenbacks was $145 in greenbacks to $100 in gold, and the optimists thought that the heavy demand for currency in an era of prosperity would return the ratio to 100. A compromise was reached in April 1866, that limited the treasury to a currency contraction of only $10 million over six months. Meanwhile, the Senate refunded the entire national debt, but the House failed to act. By early 1867, postbellum prosperity was a reality, and the optimists wanted an end to contraction, which Congress ordered in January 1868. Meanwhile, the Treasury issued new bonds at a lower interest rate to refinance the redemption of short-term debt. While the old state bank notes were disappearing from circulation, new national bank notes, backed by species, were expanding. By 1868 inflation was minimal.

Ending Reconstruction

Congressional investigation into Reconstruction states 1872
On April 20, 1871, prior to the passage of the Ku Klux Klan Act (Last of three Enforcement Acts), on the same day, the U.S. Congress launched a 21-member investigation committee on the status of the Southern Reconstruction states North Carolina, South Carolina, Georgia, Mississippi, Alabama, and Florida. Congressional members on the committee included Rep. Benjamin Butler, Sen. Zachariah Chandler, and Sen. Francis P. Blair. Subcommittee members traveled into the South to interview the people living in their respective states. Those interviewed included top-ranking officials, such as Wade Hampton III, former South Carolina Gov. James L. Orr, and Nathan Bedford Forrest, a former Confederate general and prominent Ku Klux Klan leader (Forrest denied in his congressional testimony being a member). Other Southerners interviewed included farmers, doctors, merchants, teachers, and clergymen. The committee heard numerous reports of White violence against Blacks, while many Whites denied Klan membership or knowledge of violent activities. The majority report by Republicans concluded that the government would not tolerate any Southern "conspiracy" to resist violently the congressional Reconstruction. The committee completed its 13-volume report in February 1872. While President Ulysses S. Grant had been able to suppress the KKK through the Enforcement Acts, other paramilitary insurgents organized, including the White League in 1874, active in Louisiana; and the Red Shirts, with chapters active in Mississippi and the Carolinas. They used intimidation and outright attacks to run Republicans out of office and repress voting by Blacks, leading to White Democrats regaining power by the elections of the mid-to-late 1870s.

Southern Democrats

While Republican whites supported measures for black civil rights, other whites typically opposed these measures. Some supported armed attacks to suppress blacks. They self-consciously defended their own actions within the framework of a white American discourse of resistance against tyrannical government, and they broadly succeeded in convincing many fellow White citizens, says Steedman.

The opponents of Reconstruction formed state political parties, affiliated with the national Democratic Party and often named the "Conservative Party." They supported or tolerated violent paramilitary groups, such as the White League in Louisiana and the Red Shirts in Mississippi and the Carolinas, that assassinated and intimidated both Black and White Republican leaders at election time. Historian George C. Rable called such groups the "military arm of the Democratic Party". By the mid-1870s, the "conservatives" and Democrats had aligned with the national Democratic Party, which enthusiastically supported their cause even as the national Republican Party was losing interest in Southern affairs.

Historian Walter Lynwood Fleming, associated with the early 20th-century Dunning School, describes the mounting anger of Southern Whites:

Often, these White Southerners identified as the "Conservative Party" or the "Democratic and Conservative Party" in order to distinguish themselves from the national Democratic Party and to obtain support from former Whigs. These parties sent delegates to the 1868 Democratic National Convention and abandoned their separate names by 1873 or 1874.

Most White members of both the planter and business class and common farmer class of the South opposed Reconstruction, Black civil rights and military rule and sought white supremacy. Democrats nominated some Blacks for political office and tried to entice other Blacks from the Republican side. When these attempts to combine with the Blacks failed, the planters joined the common farmers in simply trying to displace the Republican governments. The planters and their business allies dominated the self-styled "conservative" coalition that finally took control in the South. They were paternalistic toward the Blacks but feared they would use power to raise taxes and slow business development.

Fleming described the first results of the insurgent movement as "good", and the later ones as "both good and bad". According to Fleming (1907), the KKK "quieted the Negroes, made life and property safer, gave protection to women, stopped burnings, forced the Radical leaders to be more moderate, made the Negroes work better, drove the worst of the Radical leaders from the country and started the whites on the way to gain political supremacy". The evil result, Fleming said, was that lawless elements "made use of the organization as a cloak to cover their misdeeds ... The lynching habits of today [1907] are largely due to conditions, social and legal, growing out of Reconstruction." Historians have noted that the peak of lynchings took place near the turn of the century, decades after Reconstruction ended, as Whites were imposing Jim Crow laws and passing new state constitutions that disenfranchised the Blacks. The lynchings were used for intimidation and social control, with a frequency associated more with economic stresses and the settlement of sharecropper accounts at the end of the season, than for any other reason.

Ellis Paxson Oberholtzer (a Northern scholar) in 1917 explained:

As Reconstruction continued, Whites accompanied elections with increased violence in an attempt to run Republicans out of office and suppress Black voting. The victims of this violence were overwhelmingly African American, as in the Colfax Massacre of 1873. After federal suppression of the Klan in the early 1870s, White insurgent groups tried to avoid open conflict with federal forces. In 1874 in the Battle of Liberty Place, the White League entered New Orleans with 5,000 members and defeated the police and militia, to occupy federal offices for three days in an attempt to overturn the disputed government of William Pitt Kellogg, but retreated before federal troops reached the city. None was prosecuted. Their election-time tactics included violent intimidation of African American and Republican voters prior to elections, while avoiding conflict with the U.S. Army or the state militias, and then withdrawing completely on election day. White supremacist violence continued in both the North and South; the White Liners movement to elect candidates dedicated to white supremacy reached as far as Ohio in 1875.

Redemption 1873–1877

The Redeemers were the Southern wing of the Bourbon Democrats, the classically liberal, pro-business faction of the Democratic Party. They were a coalition which sought to regain political power, reestablish white supremacy, and oust the Radical Republicans from influence. Led by rich former planters, businessmen, and professionals, they dominated Southern politics in most areas from the 1870s to 1910.

Republicans split nationally: election of 1872
As early as 1868, Supreme Court Chief Justice Salmon P. Chase, a leading Radical during the war, concluded that:

By 1872, President Ulysses S. Grant had alienated large numbers of leading Republicans, including many Radicals, by the corruption of his administration and his use of federal soldiers to prop up Radical state regimes in the South. The opponents, called "Liberal Republicans", included founders of the party who expressed dismay that the party had succumbed to corruption. They were further wearied by the continued insurgent violence of Whites against Blacks in the South, especially around every election cycle, which demonstrated that the war was not over and changes were fragile. Leaders included editors of some of the nation's most powerful newspapers. Charles Sumner, embittered by the corruption of the Grant administration, joined the new party, which nominated editor Horace Greeley. The loosely-organized Democratic Party also supported Greeley.

Grant made up for the defections by new gains among Union veterans and by strong support from the "Stalwart" faction of his party (which depended on his patronage), and the Southern Republican Party. Grant won with 55.6% of the vote to Greeley's 43.8%. The Liberal Republican Party vanished and many former supporters—even former abolitionists—abandoned the cause of Reconstruction.

The Republican coalition splinters in the South
In the South, political and racial tensions built up inside the Republican Party as they were attacked by the Democrats. In 1868, Georgia Democrats, with support from some Republicans, expelled all 28 Black Republican members from the state house, arguing Blacks were eligible to vote but not to hold office. In most states, the more Whiggish Republicans fought for control with the more Radical Republicans and their Black allies. Most of the 430 Republican newspapers in the South were edited by native Southerners—only 20 percent were edited by northerners. White businessmen generally boycotted Republican papers, which survived through government patronage. Nevertheless, in the increasingly bitter battles inside the Republican Party, those who supported Reconstruction usually lost; many of the disgruntled losers switched over to the Whig-leaning or Democratic side. In Mississippi, the Whiggish faction led by James Lusk Alcorn was decisively defeated by the Radical faction led by Adelbert Ames. The party lost support steadily as many supporters of Reconstruction left it; few recruits were acquired. The most bitter contest took place inside the Republican Party in Arkansas, where the two sides armed their forces and confronted each other in the streets; no actual combat took place in the Brooks–Baxter War. The faction led by Elisha Baxter finally prevailed when the White House intervened, but both sides were badly weakened, and the Democrats soon came to power.

Meanwhile, in state after state the freedmen were demanding a bigger share of the offices and patronage, squeezing out white allies but never commanding the numbers equivalent to their population proportion. By the mid-1870s: "The hard realities of Southern political life had taught the lesson that black constituents needed to be represented by black officials." The financial depression increased the pressure on Reconstruction governments, dissolving progress.

Finally, some of the more prosperous freedmen were joining the Democrats, as they were angered at the failure of the Republicans to help them acquire land. The South was "sparsely settled"; only 10 percent of Louisiana was cultivated, and 90 percent of Mississippi bottom land was undeveloped in areas away from the river fronts, but freedmen often did not have the stake to get started. They hoped that the government would help them acquire land which they could work. Only South Carolina created any land redistribution, establishing a land commission and resettling about 14,000 freedmen families and some poor Whites on land purchased by the state.

Although historians such as W. E. B. Du Bois celebrated a cross-racial coalition of poor Whites and Blacks, such coalitions rarely formed in these years. Writing in 1915, former Congressman Lynch, recalling his experience as a Black leader in Mississippi, explained that:

Lynch reported that poor Whites resented the job competition from freedmen. Furthermore, the poor Whites:

Democrats try a "New Departure"

By 1870, the Democratic leadership across the South decided it had to end its opposition to Reconstruction and Black suffrage to survive and move on to new issues. The Grant administration had proven by its crackdown on the Ku Klux Klan that it would use as much federal power as necessary to suppress open anti-Black violence. Democrats in the North concurred with these Southern Democrats. They wanted to fight the Republican Party on economic grounds rather than race. The New Departure offered the chance for a clean slate without having to re-fight the Civil War every election. Furthermore, many wealthy Southern landowners thought they could control part of the newly enfranchised Black electorate to their own advantage.

Not all Democrats agreed; an insurgent element continued to resist Reconstruction no matter what. Eventually, a group called "Redeemers" took control of the party in the Southern states. They formed coalitions with conservative Republicans, including supporters of Reconstruction, emphasizing the need for economic modernization. Railroad building was seen as a panacea since Northern capital was needed. The new tactics were a success in Virginia where William Mahone built a winning coalition. In Tennessee, the Redeemers formed a coalition with Republican Governor Dewitt Clinton Senter. Across the South, some Democrats switched from the race issue to taxes and corruption, charging that Republican governments were corrupt and inefficient. With a continuing decrease in cotton prices, taxes squeezed cash-poor farmers who rarely saw $20 in currency a year, but had to pay taxes in currency or lose their farms. But major planters, who had never paid taxes before, often recovered their property even after confiscation.

In North Carolina, Republican Governor William Woods Holden used state troops against the Klan, but the prisoners were released by federal judges. Holden became the first governor in American history to be impeached and removed from office. Republican political disputes in Georgia split the party and enabled the Redeemers to take over.

In the North, a live-and-let-live attitude made elections more like a sporting contest. But in the Deep South, many White citizens had not reconciled with the defeat of the war or the granting of citizenship to freedmen. As an Alabaman supporter of Reconstruction explained: "Our contest here is for life, for the right to earn our bread, ... for a decent and respectful consideration as human beings and members of society."

Panic of 1873

The Panic of 1873 (a depression) hit the Southern economy hard and disillusioned many Republicans who had gambled that railroads would pull the South out of its poverty. The price of cotton fell by half; many small landowners, local merchants, and cotton factors (wholesalers) went bankrupt. Sharecropping for Black and White farmers became more common as a way to spread the risk of owning land. The old abolitionist element in the North was aging away, or had lost interest, and was not replenished. Many northern whites returned to the North or joined the Redeemers. Blacks had an increased voice in the Republican Party, but across the South it was divided by internal bickering and was rapidly losing its cohesion. Many local Black leaders started emphasizing individual economic progress in cooperation with White elites, rather than racial political progress in opposition to them, a conservative attitude that foreshadowed Booker T. Washington.

Nationally, President Grant was blamed for the depression; the Republican Party lost 96 seats in all parts of the country in the 1874 elections. The Bourbon Democrats took control of the House and were confident of electing Samuel J. Tilden president in 1876. President Grant was not running for re-election and seemed to be losing interest in the South. States fell to the Redeemers, with only four in Republican hands in 1873: Arkansas, Louisiana, Mississippi, and South Carolina. Arkansas then fell after the violent Brooks–Baxter War in 1874 ripped apart the Republican Party there.

Violence
In the lower South, violence increased as new insurgent groups arose, including the Red Shirts in Mississippi and the Carolinas, and the White League in Louisiana. The disputed election in Louisiana in 1872 found both Republican and Democratic candidates holding inaugural balls while returns were reviewed. Both certified their own slates for local parish offices in many places, causing local tensions to rise. Finally, federal support helped certify the Republican as governor.

Slates for local offices were certified by each candidate. In rural Grant Parish in the Red River Valley, freedmen fearing a Democratic attempt to take over the parish government reinforced defenses at the small Colfax courthouse in late March. White militias gathered from the area a few miles outside the settlement. Rumors and fears abounded on both sides. William Ward, an African American Union veteran and militia captain, mustered his company in Colfax and went to the courthouse. On Easter Sunday, April 13, 1873, the Whites attacked the defenders at the courthouse. There was confusion about who shot one of the White leaders after an offer by the defenders to surrender. It was a catalyst to mayhem. In the end, three Whites died and 120–150 Blacks were killed, some 50 that evening while being held as prisoners. The disproportionate numbers of Black to White fatalities and documentation of brutalized bodies are why contemporary historians call it the Colfax Massacre rather than the Colfax Riot, as it was known locally.

This marked the beginning of heightened insurgency and attacks on Republican officeholders and freedmen in Louisiana and other Deep South states. In Louisiana, Judge T. S. Crawford and District Attorney P. H. Harris of the 12th Judicial District were shot off their horses and killed by ambush October 8, 1873, while going to court. One widow wrote to the Department of Justice that her husband was killed because he was a Union man, telling "the efforts made to screen those who committed a crime".

Political violence was endemic in Louisiana. In 1874, the White militias coalesced into paramilitary organizations such as the White League, first in parishes of the Red River Valley. The new organization operated openly and had political goals: the violent overthrow of Republican rule and suppression of Black voting. White League chapters soon rose in many rural parishes, receiving financing for advanced weaponry from wealthy men. In the Coushatta Massacre in 1874, the White League assassinated six White Republican officeholders and five to 20 Black witnesses outside Coushatta, Red River Parish. Four of the White men were related to the Republican representative of the parish, who was married to a local woman; three were native to the region.

Later in 1874 the White League mounted a serious attempt to unseat the Republican governor of Louisiana, in a dispute that had simmered since the 1872 election. It brought 5,000 troops to New Orleans to engage and overwhelm forces of the metropolitan police and state militia to turn Republican Governor William P. Kellogg out of office and seat John McEnery. The White League took over and held the state house and city hall, but they retreated before the arrival of reinforcing federal troops. Kellogg had asked for reinforcements before, and Grant finally responded, sending additional troops to try to quell violence throughout plantation areas of the Red River Valley, although 2,000 troops were already in the state.

Similarly, the Red Shirts, another paramilitary group, arose in 1875 in Mississippi and the Carolinas. Like the White League and White Liner rifle clubs, to which 20,000 men belonged in North Carolina alone, these groups operated as a "military arm of the Democratic Party", to restore White supremacy.

Democrats and many Northern Republicans agreed that Confederate nationalism and slavery were dead—the war goals were achieved—and further federal military interference was an undemocratic violation of historical Republican values. The victory of Rutherford B. Hayes in the hotly contested Ohio gubernatorial election of 1875 indicated his "let alone" policy toward the South would become Republican policy, as happened when he won the 1876 Republican nomination for president.

An explosion of violence accompanied the campaign for Mississippi's 1875 election, in which Red Shirts and Democratic rifle clubs, operating in the open, threatened or shot enough Republicans to decide the election for the Democrats. Hundreds of Black men were killed. Republican Governor Adelbert Ames asked Grant for federal troops to fight back; Grant initially refused, saying public opinion was "tired out" of the perpetual troubles in the South. Ames fled the state as the Democrats took over Mississippi.

The campaigns and elections of 1876 were marked by additional murders and attacks on Republicans in Louisiana, North Carolina, South Carolina, and Florida. In South Carolina the campaign season of 1876 was marked by murderous outbreaks and fraud against freedmen. Red Shirts paraded with arms behind Democratic candidates; they killed Blacks in the Hamburg and Ellenton, South Carolina massacres. One historian estimated 150 Blacks were killed in the weeks before the 1876 election across South Carolina. Red Shirts prevented almost all Black voting in two majority-Black counties. The Red Shirts were also active in North Carolina.

A 2019 study found that counties that were occupied by the U.S. Army to enforce enfranchisement of emancipated slaves were more likely to elect Black politicians. The study also found that "political murders by White-supremacist groups occurred less frequently" in these counties than in Southern counties that were not occupied.

Election of 1876

Reconstruction continued in South Carolina, Louisiana, and Florida until 1877. The elections of 1876 were accompanied by heightened violence across the Deep South. A combination of ballot stuffing and intimidating Blacks suppressed their vote even in majority Black counties. The White League was active in Louisiana. After Republican Rutherford B. Hayes won the disputed 1876 presidential election, the national Compromise of 1877 (a corrupt bargain) was reached.

The White Democrats in the South agreed to accept Hayes' victory if he withdrew the last federal troops. By this point, the North was weary of insurgency. White Democrats controlled most of the Southern legislatures and armed militias controlled small towns and rural areas. Blacks considered Reconstruction a failure because the federal government withdrew from enforcing their ability to exercise their rights as citizens.

Hayes ends Reconstruction

On January 29, 1877, President Grant signed the Electoral Commission Act, which set up a 15-member commission of eight Republicans and seven Democrats to settle the disputed 1876 election. Since the Constitution did not explicitly indicate how Electoral College disputes were to be resolved, Congress was forced to consider other methods to settle the crisis. Many Democrats argued that Congress as a whole should determine which certificates to count. However, the chances that this method would result in a harmonious settlement were slim, as the Democrats controlled the House, while the Republicans controlled the Senate. Several Hayes supporters, on the other hand, argued that the President pro tempore of the Senate had the authority to determine which certificates to count, because he was responsible for chairing the congressional session at which the electoral votes were to be tallied. Since the office of president pro tempore was occupied by a Republican, Senator Thomas W. Ferry of Michigan, this method would have favored Hayes. Still others proposed that the matter should be settled by the Supreme Court. In a stormy session that began on March 1, 1877, the House debated the objection for about twelve hours before overruling it. Immediately, another spurious objection was raised, this time to the electoral votes from Wisconsin. Again, the Senate voted to overrule the objection, while a filibuster was conducted in the House. However, the Speaker of the House, Democrat Samuel J. Randall, refused to entertain dilatory motions. Eventually, the filibusterers gave up, allowing the House to reject the objection in the early hours of March 2. The House and Senate then reassembled to complete the count of the electoral votes. At 4:10 am on March 2, Senator Ferry announced that Hayes and Wheeler had been elected to the presidency and vice presidency, by an electoral margin of 185–184.

The Democrats agreed not to block Hayes' inauguration based on a "back room" deal. Key to this deal was the understanding that federal troops would no longer interfere in Southern politics despite substantial election-associated violence against Blacks. The Southern states indicated that they would protect the lives of African Americans; however, such promises were largely not kept. Hayes' friends also let it be known that he would promote federal aid for internal improvements, including help with a railroad in Texas (which never happened) and name a Southerner to his cabinet (this did happen). With the end to the political role of Northern troops, the president had no method to enforce Reconstruction; thus, this "back room" deal signaled the end of American Reconstruction.

After assuming office on March 4, 1877, President Hayes removed troops from the capitals of the remaining Reconstruction states, Louisiana and South Carolina, allowing the Redeemers to have full control of these states. President Grant had already removed troops from Florida, before Hayes was inaugurated, and troops from the other Reconstruction states had long since been withdrawn. Hayes appointed David M. Key from Tennessee, a Southern Democrat, to the position of postmaster general. By 1879, thousands of African American "Exodusters" packed up and headed to new opportunities in Kansas.

The Democrats gained control of the Senate, and had complete control of Congress, having taken over the House in 1875. Hayes vetoed bills from the Democrats that outlawed the Republican Enforcement Acts; however, with the military underfunded, Hayes could not adequately enforce these laws. African-Americans remained involved in Southern politics, particularly in Virginia, which was run by the biracial Readjuster Party.

Numerous African-Americans were elected to local office through the 1880s, and in the 1890s in some states, biracial coalitions of populists and Republicans briefly held control of state legislatures. In the last decade of the 19th century, Southern states elected five Black U.S. congressmen before disenfranchising state constitutions were passed throughout the former Confederacy.

Legacy and historiography
Besides the election of Southern black people to state governments and the United States Congress, other achievements of the Reconstruction era include "the South's first state-funded public school systems, more equitable taxation legislation, laws against racial discrimination in public transport and accommodations and ambitious economic development programs (including aid to railroads and other enterprises)." Despite these achievements the interpretation of Reconstruction has been a topic of controversy because nearly all historians hold that Reconstruction ended in failure, but for very different reasons.

The first generation of Northern historians believed that the former Confederates were traitors and Johnson was their ally who threatened to undo the Union's constitutional achievements. By the 1880s, however, Northern historians argued that Johnson and his allies were not traitors but had blundered badly in rejecting the Fourteenth Amendment and setting the stage for Radical Reconstruction.

The Black leader Booker T. Washington, who grew up in West Virginia during Reconstruction, concluded later that: "the Reconstruction experiment in racial democracy failed because it began at the wrong end, emphasizing political means and civil rights acts rather than economic means and self-determination". His solution was to concentrate on building the economic infrastructure of the Black community, in part by his leadership and the Southern Tuskegee Institute.

Dunning School: 1900 to 1920s
The Dunning School of scholars, who were trained at the history department of Columbia University under Professor William A. Dunning, analyzed Reconstruction as a failure after 1866 for different reasons. They claimed that Congress took freedoms and rights from qualified Whites and gave them to unqualified Blacks who were being duped by what they called "corrupt carpetbaggers and scalawags". As T. Harry Williams (who was a sharp critic of the Dunning School) noted, the Dunning scholars portrayed the era in stark terms:

Revisionists and Beardians, 1930s–1940s
In the 1930s, historical revisionism became popular among scholars. As disciples of Charles A. Beard, revisionists focused on economics, downplaying politics and constitutional issues. The central figure was a young scholar at the University of Wisconsin, Howard K. Beale, who in his PhD dissertation, finished in 1924, developed a complex new interpretation of Reconstruction. The Dunning School portrayed freedmen as mere pawns in the hands of northern whites. Beale argued that the whites themselves were pawns in the hands of Northern industrialists, who had taken control of the nation during the Civil War and who Beale felt would be threatened by return to power of the Southern Whites. Beale further argued that the rhetoric of civil rights for Blacks, and the dream of equality, was rhetoric designed to fool idealistic voters, calling it "claptrap", arguing: "Constitutional discussions of the rights of the Negro, the status of Southern states, the legal position of ex-rebels, and the powers of Congress and the president determined nothing. They were pure sham." The Beard–Beale interpretation of Reconstruction became known as "revisionism", and replaced the Dunning School for most historians until the 1950s, after which it was largely discredited.

The Beardian interpretation of the causes of the Civil War downplayed slavery, abolitionism, and issues of morality. It ignored constitutional issues of states' rights and even ignored American nationalism as the force that finally led to victory in the war. Indeed, the ferocious combat itself was passed over as merely an ephemeral event. Much more important was the calculus of class conflict. As the Beards explained in The Rise of American Civilization (1927), the Civil War was really a:

The Beards were especially interested in the Reconstruction era, as the industrialists of the Northeast and the farmers of the West cashed in on their great victory over the Southern aristocracy. Historian Richard Hofstadter paraphrases the Beards as arguing that in victory:

Wisconsin historian William Hesseltine added the point that the Northeastern businessmen wanted to control the Southern economy directly, which they did through ownership of the railroads. The Beard–Beale interpretation of the monolithic Northern industrialists fell apart in the 1950s when it was closely examined by numerous historians, including Robert P. Sharkey, Irwin Unger, and Stanley Coben. The younger scholars conclusively demonstrated that there was no unified economic policy on the part of the dominant Republican Party. Some wanted high tariffs and some low. Some wanted greenbacks and others wanted gold. There was no conspiracy to use Reconstruction to impose any such unified economic policy on the nation. Northern businessmen were widely divergent on monetary or tariff policy, and seldom paid attention to Reconstruction issues. Furthermore, the rhetoric on behalf of the rights of the freedmen was not claptrap but deeply-held and very serious political philosophy.

Black historians
The Black scholar W. E. B. Du Bois, in his Black Reconstruction in America, 1860–1880, published in 1935, compared results across the states to show achievements by the Reconstruction legislatures and to refute claims about wholesale African American control of governments. He showed Black contributions, as in the establishment of universal public education, charitable and social institutions and universal suffrage as important results, and he noted their collaboration with Whites. He also pointed out that Whites benefited most by the financial deals made, and he put excesses in the perspective of the war's aftermath. He noted that despite complaints, several states kept their Reconstruction era state constitutions into the early 20th century. Despite receiving favorable reviews, his work was largely ignored by White historians of his time.

Neo-abolitionists
In the 1960s, neo-abolitionist historians emerged, led by John Hope Franklin, Kenneth Stampp, Leon Litwack, and Eric Foner. Influenced by the civil rights movement, they rejected the Dunning School and found a great deal to praise in Radical Reconstruction. Foner, the primary advocate of this view, argued that it was never truly completed, and that a "Second Reconstruction" was needed in the late 20th century to complete the goal of full equality for African Americans. The neo-abolitionists followed the revisionists in minimizing the corruption and waste created by Republican state governments, saying it was no worse than Boss Tweed's ring in New York City.

Instead, they emphasized that suppression of the rights of African Americans was a worse scandal, and a grave corruption of America's republicanist ideals. They argued that the tragedy of Reconstruction was not that it failed because Blacks were incapable of governing, especially as they did not dominate any state government, but that it failed because Whites raised an insurgent movement to restore White supremacy. White-elite-dominated state legislatures passed disenfranchising state constitutions from 1890 to 1908 that effectively barred most Blacks and many poor Whites from voting. This disenfranchisement affected millions of people for decades into the 20th century, and closed African Americans  poor Whites out of the political process in the South.

Re-establishment of White supremacy meant that within a decade African Americans were excluded from virtually all local, state, and federal governance in all states of the South. Lack of representation meant that they were treated as second-class citizens, with schools and services consistently underfunded in segregated societies, no representation on juries or in law enforcement, and bias in other legislation. It was not until the civil rights movement and the passage of the Civil Rights Act of 1964 and the Voting Rights Act of 1965 that segregation was outlawed and suffrage restored, under what is sometimes referred to as the "Second Reconstruction".

In 1990, Eric Foner concluded that from the Black point of view "Reconstruction must be judged a failure." Foner stated Reconstruction was "a noble if flawed experiment, the first attempt to introduce a genuine inter-racial democracy in the United States". According to him, the many factors contributing to the failure included: lack of a permanent federal agency specifically designed for the enforcement of civil rights; the Morrison R. Waite Supreme Court decisions that dismantled previous congressional civil rights legislation; and the economic reestablishment of Whiggish white planters in the South by 1877. Historian William McFeely explained that although the constitutional amendments and civil rights legislation on their own merit were remarkable achievements, no permanent government agency whose specific purpose was civil rights enforcement had been created.

More recent work by Nina Silber, David W. Blight, Cecelia O'Leary, Laura Edwards, LeeAnn Whites, and Edward J. Blum has encouraged greater attention to race, religion, and issues of gender while at the same time pushing the effective end of Reconstruction to the end of the 19th century, while monographs by Charles Reagan Wilson, Gaines Foster, W. Scott Poole, and Bruce Baker have offered new views of the Southern "Lost Cause".

Dating the end of the Reconstruction era
At the national level, textbooks typically date the era from 1865 to 1877. Eric Foner's textbook of national history Give Me Liberty is an example. His monograph Reconstruction: America's Unfinished Revolution, 1863–1877 (1988) focusing on the situation in the South, covers 1863 to 1865. While 1877 is the usual date given for the end of Reconstruction, some historians such as Orville Vernon Burton extend the era to the 1890s to include the imposition of segregation.

The year 1877 is also commonly used as a dividing point for two-semester survey courses and two-volume textbooks that aim to cover all of U.S. history.

Economic role of race
Economists and economic historians have different interpretations of the economic impact of race on the postbellum Southern economy. In 1995, Robert Whaples took a random survey of 178 members of the Economic History Association, who studied American history in all time periods. He asked whether they wholly or partly accepted, or rejected, 40 propositions in the scholarly literature about American economic history. The greatest difference between economics PhDs and history PhDs came in questions on competition and race. For example, the proposition originally put forward by Robert Higgs, "in the post-bellum South economic competition among Whites played an important part in protecting blacks from racial coercion", was accepted in whole or part by 66% of the economists, but by only 22% of the historians. Whaples says this highlights: "A recurring difference dividing historians and economists. The economists have more faith in the power of the competitive market. For example, they see the competitive market as protecting disenfranchised blacks and are less likely to accept the idea that there was exploitation by merchant monopolists."

The "failure" issue
Reconstruction is widely considered a failure, though the reason for this is a matter of controversy.
 The Dunning School considered failure inevitable because it felt that taking the right to vote or hold office away from Southern Whites was a violation of republicanism.
 A second school sees the reason for failure as Northern Republicans' lack of effectiveness in guaranteeing political rights to Blacks.
 A third school blames the failure on not giving land to the freedmen so they could have their own economic base of power.
 A fourth school sees the major reason for the failure of Reconstruction as the states' inability to suppress the violence of Southern Whites when they sought reversal for Blacks' gains. Etcheson (2009) points to the "violence that crushed black aspirations and the abandonment by Northern whites of Southern Republicans". Etcheson wrote that it is hard to see Reconstruction "as concluding in anything but failure". Etcheson adds: "W. E. B. DuBois captured that failure well when he wrote in Black Reconstruction in America (1935): 'The slave went free; stood a brief moment in the sun; then moved back again toward slavery.
 Other historians emphasize the failure to fully incorporate Southern Unionists into the Republican coalition. Derek W. Frisby points to "Reconstruction's failure to appreciate the challenges of Southern Unionism and incorporate these loyal Southerners into a strategy that would positively affect the character of the peace".

Historian Donald R. Shaffer maintained that the gains during Reconstruction for African Americans were not entirely extinguished. The legalization of African American marriages and families and the independence of Black churches from White denominations were a source of strength during the Jim Crow era. Reconstruction was never forgotten within the Black community and it remained a source of inspiration. The system of sharecropping granted Blacks a considerable amount of freedom as compared to slavery.

Historian Eric Foner argues:

However, in 2014, historian Mark Summers argued that the "failure" question should be looked at from the viewpoint of the war goals; in that case, he argues:

In popular culture

The journalist Joel Chandler Harris, who wrote under the name "Joe Harris" for the Atlanta Constitution (mostly after Reconstruction), tried to advance racial and sectional reconciliation in the late 19th century. He supported Henry W. Grady's vision of a New South during Grady's time as editor from 1880 to 1889. Harris wrote many editorials in which he encouraged Southerners to accept the changed conditions along with some Northern influences, but he asserted his belief that change should proceed under White supremacy.

In popular literature, two early 20th-century novels by Thomas Dixon Jr. – The Leopard's Spots: A Romance of the White Man's Burden – 1865–1900 (1902), and The Clansman: A Historical Romance of the Ku Klux Klan (1905) – idealized White resistance to Northern and Black coercion, hailing vigilante action by the Ku Klux Klan. D. W. Griffith adapted Dixon's The Clansman for the screen in his anti-Republican movie The Birth of a Nation (1915); it stimulated the formation of the 20th-century version of the KKK. Many other authors romanticized the supposed benevolence of slavery and the elite world of the antebellum plantations, in memoirs and histories which were published in the late 19th and early 20th centuries; the United Daughters of the Confederacy promoted influential works which were written in these genres by women.

Of much more lasting impact was the story Gone with the Wind, first in the form of the best-selling 1936 novel, which enabled its author Margaret Mitchell to win the Pulitzer Prize, and an award-winning Hollywood blockbuster with the same title in 1939. In each case, the second half of the story focuses on Reconstruction in Atlanta. The book sold millions of copies nationwide; the film is regularly re-broadcast on television. In 2018, it remained at the top of the list of highest-grossing films, adjusted in order to keep up with inflation. The New Georgia Encyclopedia argues:

In education 
The "Dunning School" dominated white scholarship about Reconstruction during most of the 20th century. Black scholarship on the Reconstruction era was mostly ignored until the civil rights movement of the 1950s and 1960s, though the racist interpretations of the Dunning School continue to this day. 

Historian Eric Foner said, "for no other period of American history does so wide a gap exist between current scholarship and popular historical understanding, which, judging from references to Reconstruction in recent newspaper articles, films, popular books, and in public monuments across the country, still bears the mark of the old Dunning School."

As reported in a January 2022 Time magazine article:In social studies standards for 45 out of 50 states and the District of Columbia, discussion of Reconstruction is "partial" or "non-existent", according to historians who reviewed how the period is discussed in K-12 social studies standards for public schools nationwide. In a report produced by the education nonprofit Zinn Education Project, the study's authors say they are concerned that American children will grow up to be uninformed about a critical period of history that helps explain why full racial equality remains unfulfilled today.The Zinn Education Project's report, Erasing the Black Freedom Struggle: How State Standards Fail to Teach the Truth About Reconstruction, highlights the historical connections to Reconstruction that surround us today and examines Reconstruction's place in state social studies standards across the United States and the barriers to teaching effective Reconstruction history.

According to a Facing South article entitled "The South's schools are failing to teach accurate Reconstruction history":"It is our hope that states and districts will adopt these guidelines for their own educational standards, curricula, and professional development," the report states. "In so doing, they will be better equipped to teach students the true history of Reconstruction, help students understand its significance and make connections to the present day. And they will empower teachers to educate their students and themselves about ongoing Reconstruction scholarship."

See also
 African American founding fathers of the United States
 Reconstruction Era National Monument
 Remembering Reconstruction: Struggles over the Meaning of America's Most Turbulent Era

References

Notes

Citations

Bibliography
For much more detail see Reconstruction: Bibliography

Scholarly secondary sources

 
 
 
 
 
 
 
 
 
  scholarly review and response by Calhoun at 
 
 
  
 
 
 
 
  Pulitzer-prize winning history, and most detailed synthesis of original and previous scholarship.
 
 
 
 
 
 
  Portrays Lincoln as opponent of Radicals.
 
 
 
 
 
 
 
 
 Lynd, Staughton, ed. (1967). Reconstruction. New York, Evanston, and London: Harper & Row, Publishers.
 
 
 
 
 
 
 
 
 
 
 
 
 
   Highly detailed narrative by Pulitzer Prize winner; argues was a political disaster because it violated the rights of White Southerners.
 Volume: 6: 1865–72 (via Google Books)
 Volume: 7: 1877 (via Google Books)
 
 
 
 
 
 
 
  excerpt and text search
  text search; online
 
 
 
 
 
 
 
 
  (2 vols.)

Historiography

 
 Ford, Lacy K., ed. A Companion to the Civil War and Reconstruction. Blackwell (2005) 518 pp.
 Frantz, Edward O., ed. A Companion to the Reconstruction Presidents 1865–1881 (2014). 30 essays by scholars.
 
 Perman, Michael and Amy Murrell Taylor, eds. Major Problems in the Civil War and Reconstruction: Documents and Essays (2010)
 
 
  Uses primary documents to present opposing viewpoints.
  Essays by scholars.

Yearbooks

 Appleton's American Annual Cyclopedia and Register of Important Events of the Year 1867 (highly detailed compendium of facts and primary sources; details on every U.S. state & the national government)
 Appleton's American Annual Cyclopedia... for 1868 (1873)
 Appleton's American Annual Cyclopedia... for 1869 (1869)
 Appleton's American Annual Cyclopedia... for 1870 (1871)
 Appleton's American Annual Cyclopedia... for 1872 (1873)
 Appleton's American Annual Cyclopedia... for 1873 (1879)
 Appleton's American Annual Cyclopedia... for 1875 (1876)
 Appleton's American Annual Cyclopedia... for 1876 (1877)
 Appleton's American Annual Cyclopedia... for 1877 (1878)
 The American year-book and national register for 1869 (1869) online

Primary sources

 Barnes, William H., ed., History of the Thirty-ninth Congress of the United States (1868). Summary of Congressional activity.
 Berlin, Ira, ed. Freedom: A Documentary History of Emancipation, 1861–1867 (1982), 970 pp. of archival documents; also Free at Last: A Documentary History of Slavery, Freedom, and the Civil War ed by Ira Berlin, Barbara J. Fields, and Steven F. Miller (1993).
 Blaine, James G. Twenty Years of Congress: From Lincoln to Garfield. With a review of the events which led to the political revolution of 1860 (1886). By Republican Congressional leader Vol. 2 (via Internet Archive).
 
  2 vols. Presents a broad collection of primary sources; Vol. 1: On National Politics; Vol. 2: On States (via Google Books).
 Memoirs of W. W. Holden (1911); via Internet Archive. North Carolina "scalawag" governor.
 Hyman, Harold M., ed. The Radical Republicans and Reconstruction, 1861–1870 (1967), collection of long political speeches and pamphlets.
 
  One of the first Black congressmen during Reconstruction.
 
  large collection of speeches and primary documents, 1865–1870, complete text online. [The copyright has expired.]
 Palmer, Beverly Wilson; Byers Ochoa, Holly; eds. The Selected Papers of Thaddeus Stevens 2 vols. (1998), 900 pp; his speeches plus and letters to and from Stevens.
 Palmer, Beverly Wilson, ed. The Selected Letters of Charles Sumner, 2 vols. (1990); Vol. 2 covers 1859–1874.
 
 Pike, James Shepherd The prostrate state: South Carolina under negro government (1874)
 Reid, Whitelaw After the War: A Southern Tour, May 1, 1865 to May 1, 1866 (1866). By Republican editor.
 Smith, John David, ed. We Ask Only for Even-Handed Justice: Black Voices from Reconstruction, 1865–1877 (University of Massachusetts Press, 2014). xviii, 133 pp.
 Sumner, Charles 'Our Domestic Relations: or, How to Treat the Rebel States' Atlantic Monthly September 1863, early abolitionist manifesto.

Further reading

 
 Du Bois, W. E. B. Black Reconstruction in America 1860–1880 (1935), Counterpoint to Dunning School explores the economics and politics of the era from Marxist perspective
  Influential summary of Dunning School; blames Carpetbaggers for failure of Reconstruction.
 Fitzgerald, Michael W. Splendid Failure: Postwar Reconstruction in the American South (2007), 224pp; excerpt and text search
 Fitzgerald, Michael R. Reconstruction in Alabama: From Civil War to Redemption in the Cotton South (LSU Press, 2017) 464 pages; a standard scholarly history
 
 
  excerpt; online review: 
 Levine, Robert S. The Failed Promise: Reconstruction, Frederick Douglass, and the Impeachment of Andrew Johnson (2021). New York: W.W. Norton & Co.
 Litwack, Leon. Been in the Storm So Long (1979). Pulitzer Prize; social history of the freedmen
 Prior, David. Between Freedom and Progress: The Lost World of Reconstruction Politics (LSU Press, 2019).

 
  Also available via WikiSource.
 
Suryanarayan, Pavithra, and White, Steven (2020). Slavery, Reconstruction, and Bureaucratic Capacity in the American South. American Political Science Review.

Newspapers and magazines

 DeBow's Review major Southern conservative magazine; stress on business, economics and statistics
 Harper's Weekly leading New York news magazine; pro-Radical
 Nast, Thomas, magazine cartoons pro-Radical editorial cartoons
 Primary sources from Gilder-Lehrman collection 
 The New York Times daily edition online through ProQuest at academic libraries

External links

 Behn, Richard J., ed. [2002] 2020. "Reconstruction". Mr. Lincoln and Freedom. The Lehrman Institute.
 Bragg, William Harris. [2005] 2019. "Reconstruction in Georgia". New Georgia Encyclopedia.
 Green Jr., Robert P. 1991. "Reconstruction Historiography: A Source of Teaching Ideas". The Social Studies (July/August):153–57.
 Jensen, Richard. 2006. "Jensen's Guide to Reconstruction History, 1861–1877" . Scholars' Guide to WWW. University of Illinois Chicago. Links to primary and secondary sources.
 Mabry, Donald J. 2006. "Reconstruction in Mississippi". The Historical Text Archive.
 Seward, William H. 1866. "Proclamation Declaring the Insurrection at an End". American Historical Documents, 1000–1904, (The Harvard Classics 43).
 Smith, Llewellyn M., dir. 2004. "Reconstruction: The Second Civil War", American Experience. PBS. Film connecting the replacement of civil rights with segregation and disenfranchisement at the end of 19th-century during the Jim Crow era.
 "Civil Rights During Reconstruction" – Historians Eric Foner, David Blight and Ed Ayers discuss "Civil Rights During Reconstruction"
 "Reconstruction: Era and Definition". The History Channel. A&E Networks.
 "The Civil War: Reconstruction". [2002] 2015. – This is part of an extensive assessment of the Civil War and slavery which gives particular attention to children.
 "The Civil War and Reconstruction Era, 1845–1877" [HIST 119]. Open Yale Courses. New Haven, Connecticut: Yale University. Full semester course in text/audio/video; materials free under the Creative Commons license.

 

 
40th United States Congress
1860s in Alabama
1860s in Arkansas
1860s in Florida
1860s in Georgia (U.S. state)
1860s in Louisiana
1860s in Mississippi
1860s in North Carolina
1860s in South Carolina
1860s in Tennessee
1860s in Texas
1860s in Virginia
1870s in Georgia (U.S. state)
1870s in Mississippi
1870s in Texas
1870s in Virginia
African-American history between emancipation and the civil rights movement
Aftermath of the American Civil War
American military occupations
History of African-American civil rights
History of civil rights in the United States
History of the Southern United States
History of voting rights in the United States
Legal history of Alabama
Legal history of Arkansas
Legal history of Florida
Legal history of Georgia (U.S. state)
Legal history of Louisiana
Legal history of Mississippi
Legal history of North Carolina
Legal history of South Carolina
Legal history of Tennessee
Legal history of Texas
Legal history of Virginia
Military occupation
Political repression in the United States
Presidency of Abraham Lincoln
Presidency of Andrew Johnson
Presidency of Ulysses S. Grant
Presidency of Rutherford B. Hayes
Race-related controversies in the United States